In this checklist are presented all wasp species of family Ichneumonidae.


Index
A B C D E F G H I J K L M N O P Q R S T U V W X Y Z

Checklist

A

Absyrtus vicinator (Thunberg, 1822)
Acaenitus dubitator (Panzer, 1800)
Achaius oratorius (Fabricius, 1793)
Aclastus gracilis (Thomson, 1884)
Aclastus minutus (Bridgman, 1886)
Aclastus solutus (Thomson, 1884)
Acolobus albimanus (Gravenhorst, 1829)
Acolobus sericeus Wesmael, 1844
Aconias tarsatus (Bridgman, 1881)
Acrodactyla degener (Haliday, 1838)
Acrodactyla madida (Haliday, 1838)
Acrodactyla qundrisculpta (Gravenhorst, 1820)
Acrolyta distincta (Bridgman, 1883)
Acrolyta marginata (Bridgman, 1883)
Acrolyta submarginata (Bridgman, 1883)
Acrolyta xylonomoides (Morley, 1907)
Acropimpla didyma (Gravenhorst, 1829)
Acroricnus stylator (Thunberg, 1822)
Acrotomus lucidulus (Gravenhorst, 1829)
Acrotomus succinctus (Gravenhorst, 1829)
Adelognathus brevicornis Holmgren, 1855
Adelognathus britannicus Perkins, 1943
Adelognathus chrysopygus (Gravenhorst, 1829)
Adelognathus dorsalis (Gravenhorst, 1829)
Adelognathus fasciatus Thomson, 1883
Adelognathus granulatus Perkins, 1943
Adelognathus laevicollis Thomson, 1883
Adelognathus nigriceps Thomson, 1888
Adelognathus nigricornis Thomson, 1888
Adelognathus nigrifrons Holmgren, 1855
Adelognathus pallipes (Gravenhorst, 1829)
Adelognathus pilosus Thomson, 1888
Adelognathus pusillus Holmgren, 1855
Adelognathus stelfoxi Fitton, Gauld & Shaw, 1982
Adelognathus thomsoni Schmiedeknecht, 1911
Aethecerus discolor Wesmael, 1844
Aethecerus dispar Wesmael, 1844
Aethecerus longulus Wesmael, 1844
Aethecerus nitidus Wesmael, 1844
Aethecerus placidus Wesmael, 1844
Afrephialtes cicatricosa (Gravenhorst, 1829)
Agasthenes varitarsus (Gravenhorst, 1829)
Agriotypus armatus Curtis, 1832
Agrothereutes abbreviator (Fabricius, 1793)
Agrothereutes adustus (Gravenhorst, 1829)
Agrothereutes amoenus (Gravenhorst, 1829)
Agrothereutes aterrimus (Gravenhorst, 1829)
Agrothereutes batavus Vollenhoven, 1873
Agrothereutes brevipenms (Marshall, 1867)
Agrothereutes fumipennis (Gravenhorst, 1829)
Agrothereutes grossus (Gravenhorst, 1829)
Agrothereutes hospes (Tschek, 1870)
Agrothereutes mandator (Linnaeus, 1758)
Agrothereutes saturniae (Boie, 1855)
Agrothereutes tibialis (Thomson, 1873)
Agrothereutes tricolor (Gravenhorst, 1829)
Agrypon anomalas (Gravenhorst, 1829)
Agrypon anxium (Wesmael, 1849)
Agrypon brevicolle (Wesmael, 1849)
Agrypon clandestinum (Gravenhorst, 1829)
Agrypon delarvatum (Gravenhorst, 1829)
Agrypon flaveolatum (Gravenhorst, 1807)
Agrypon flexorium (Thunberg, 1822)
Agrypon gracilipes (Curtis, 1839)
Agrypon varitarsum (Wesmael, 1849)
Alexeter attenuatus (Bridgman, 1888)
Alexeter erythrocerus (Gravenhorst, 1829)
Alexeter fallax (Holmgren, 1855)
Alexeter gracihpes (Curtis, 1837)
Alexeter multicolor (Gravenhorst, 1829)
Alexeter nebulator (Thunberg, 1822)
Alexeter niger (Gravenhorst, 1829)
Alexeter rapinator (Gravenhorst, 1829)
Alexeter sectator (Thunberg, 1822)
Alexeter testaceator (Thunberg, 1822)
Allophroides boops (Gravenhorst, 1829)
Alloplasta piceator (Thunberg, 1822)
Alloplasta plantaria (Gravenhorst, 1829)
Alomya debellator (Fabricius, 1775)
Alomya semifiava Stephens, 1835
Amblyjoppa fuscipennis (Wesmael, 1844)
Amblyjoppa proteus (Christ, 1791)
Amblyteles armatorius (Forster, 1771)
Aneuclis melanarius (Holmgren, 1860)
Aniseres lubricus Förster, 1871
Anisobas cingulatorius (Gravenhorst, 1820)
Anisobas platystylus Thomson, 1888
Anomalon foliator (Fabricius, 1798)
Aoplus altercator (Wesmael, 1855)
Aoplus castaneus Gravenhorst, 1820)
Aoplus defraudator (Wesmael, 1844)
Aoplus humilis (Wesmael, 1857)
Aoplus lariciatae (Kriechbaumer, 1890)
Aoplus ochropis (Gmelin in Linnaeus, 1790)
Aoplus ratzeburgii (Hartig, 1838)
Aoplus rubricosus (Holmgren, 1864)
Aoplus ruficeps (Gravenhorst, 1829)
Aoplus virginalis (Wesmael, 1844)
Apaeleticus bellicosus Wesmael, 1844
Apaeleticus inimicus (Gravenhorst, 1820)
Apechthis compunctor (Linnaeus, 1758)
Apechthis quadridentatus (Thomson, 1877)
Apechthis rufatus (Gmelin in Linnaeus, 1790)
Aperileptus albipalpus (Gravenhorst, 1829)
Aperileptus inamoenus Förster, 1871
Aphanistes bellicosus (Wesmael, 1849)
Aphanistes ruficornis (Gravenhorst, 1829)
Aphanistes xanthopus (Schrank, 1781)
Apophua bipunctoria (Thunberg, 1822)
Apophua cicatricosa (Ratzeburg, 1848)
Apophua evanescens (Ratzeburg, 1848)
Apophua genalis (Müller, 1883)
Apsilops aquaticus (Thomson, 1874)
Apsilops cinctorius (Fabricius, 1775)
Aptesis abdominator (Gravenhorst, 1829)
Aptesis albulatoria (Gravenhorst, 1829)
Aptesis assimilis (Gravenhorst, 1829)
Aptesis bifrons (Gmelin in Linnaeus, 1790)
Aptesis cretata (Gravenhorst, 1829)
Aptesis femoralls (Qrhomson, 1883)
Aptesis fiagitator (Rossius, 1794)
Aptesis funerea (Schmiedeknecht, 1905)
Aptesis gracilicornis (Kriechbaumer, 1891)
Aptesis graviceps Marshall, 1868
Aptesis hopei (Desvignes, 1856)
Aptesis improba (Gravenhorst, 1829)
Aptesis labralis (Gravenhorst, 1829)
Aptesis leucosticta (Gravenhorst, 1829)
Aptesis nigritula (Thomson, 1885)
Aptesis nigrocincta (Gravenhorst, 1829)
Aptesis scotica (Marshall, 1868)
Aptesis sericans (Gravenhorst, 1829)
Aptesis subguttata (Gravenhorst, 1829)
Aptesis terminata (Gravenhorst, 1829)
Aptesis tricincta (Gravenhorst, 1829)
Aptesis unifasciata (Schmiedeknecht, 1905)
Arbelus athallaeperdus (Curtis, 1860)
Arenetra pilosella (Gravenhorst, 1829)
Aritranis bellosa (Curtis, 1837)
Aritranis confector (Gravenhorst, 1829)
Aritranis dubia (Taschenberg, 1865)
Aritranis fugitiva (Gravenhorst, 1829)
Aritranis nigripes (Gravenhorst, 1829)
Aritranis occisor (Gravenhorst, 1829)
Aritranis quadriguttata (Gravenhorst, 1829)
Aritranis rufoniger (Desvignes, 1856)
Aritranis subcincta (Gravenhorst, 1829)
Arotes albicinctus Gravenhorst, 1829
Arotrephes speculator (Gravenhorst, 1829)
Asthenolabus latiscapus (Thomson, 1894)
Asthenolabus vitratorius (Gravenhorst, 1829)
Astiphromma dorsale (Holmgren, 1860)
Astiphromma graniger (Thomson, 1886)
Astiphromma hamulum (Thomson, 1886)
Astiphromma mandibulare (Thomson, 1886)
Astiphromma pictum (Brischke, 1880)
Astiphromma plagiatum (Thomson, 1886)
Astiphromma scutellatum (Gravenhorst, 1829)
Astiphromma sericans (Curtis, 1833)
Astiphromma splenium (Curtis, 1833)
Astiphromma strenuum (Holmgren, 1860)
Astiphromma tenuicorne (Thomson, 1886)
Atractodes ambigaus Ruthe, 1859
Atractodes angustipennis Förster, 1876
Atractodes arator Haliday, 1838
Atractodes bicolor Gravenhorst, 1829
Atractodes breviscapus Thomson, 1884
Atractodes compressus Thomson, 1884
Atractodes croceicornis Haliday, 1838
Atractodes cultellator Haliday, 1838
Atractodes discoloripes Förster, 1876
Atractodes exilis Haliday, 1838
Atractodes foveolatus Gravenhorst, 1829
Atractodes gilvipes Holmgren, 1860
Atractodes gravidus Gravenhorst, 1829
Atractodes nigripes Förster, 1876
Atractodes oreophilus Förster, 1876
Atractodes picipes Holmgren, 1860
Atractodes pusillus Förster, 1876
Atractodes tenuipes Thomson
Atractodes vestalls Haliday, 1838
Atrometus insignis Förster, 1878
Azelus erythropalpus (Gmelin in Linnaeus, 1790)

B

Banchus compressus (Fabricius, 1787) preocc.
Banchus crefeldensis Ulbricht, 1916
Banchus falcatorius (Fabricius, 1775)
Banchus hastator (Fabricius, 1793)
Banchus monileatus Gravenhorst, 1829
Banchus pictus Fabricius, 1798
Banchus volutatorius (Linnaeus, 1758)
Barichneumon albilineatus (Gravenhorst, 1820)
Barichneumon albosignatus (Gravenhorst, 1829)
Barichneumon anator (Fabricius, 1793)
Barichneumon basalls Perkins, 1960
Barichneumon bilunulatus (Gravenhorst, 1829)
Barichneumon bimaculatus (Schrank, 1776)
Barichneumon calilcerus (Gravenhorst, 1820)
Barichneumon chionomus (Wesmael, 1844)
Barichneumon deceptor (Scopoli, 1763)
Barichneumon derogator (Wesmael, 1844)
Barichneumon digrammus (Gravenhorst, 1820)
Barichneumon dumeticola (Gravenhorst, 1829)
Barichneumon faunus (Gravenhorst, 1829)
Barichneumon gemellus (Gravenhorst, 1829)
Barichneumon heracilana (Bridgman, 1884)
Barichneumon lepidus (Gravenhorst, 1829)
Barichneumon macuilcauda Perkins, 1953
Barichneumon monostagon (Gravenhorst, 1820)
Barichneumon peregrinator (Linnaeus, 1758)
Barichneumon plagiarius (Wesmael, 1848)
Barichneumon praeceptor (Thunberg, 1822)
Barichneumon ridibundus (Gravenhorst, 1829)
Barichneumon sanguinator (Rossius, 1794)
Barichneumon tergenus (Gravenhorst, 1820)
Barycnemis bellator (Müller, 1776)
Barycnemis dissimilis (Gravenhorst, 1829)
Barycnemis exhaustator (Fabricius, 1798)
Barycnemis gravipes (Gravenhorst, 1829)
Barycnemis guttulator (Thunberg, 1822)
Barycnemis harpurus (Schrank, 1802)
Barylypa delictor (Thunberg, 1822)
Barylypa insidiator (Förster, 1878)
Barylypa uniguttata (Gravenhorst, 1829)
Barytarbes colon (Gravenhorst, 1829)
Barytarbes flavoscutellatus (Thomson, 1892)
Barytarbes laeviusculus (Thomson, 1883)
Barytarbes segmentarius (Fabricius, 1787)
Barytarbes sp. Förster, 1868
Bathyplectes anura (Thomson, 1887)
Bathyplectes exiguus (Gravenhorst, 1829)
Bathyplectes immolator (Gravenhorst, 1829)
Bathyplectes rostratus (Thomson, 1887)
Bathyplectes tristis (Gravenhorst, 1829)
Bathythrix aereus (Gravenhorst, 1829)
Bathythrix alter (Kerrich, 1942)
Bathythrix argentatus (Gravenhorst, 1829)
Bathythrix bellulus (Kriechbaumer, 1892)
Bathythrix brevis (Thomson, 1884)
Bathythrix claviger (Taschenberg, 1865)
Bathythrix collaris (Thomson, 1896)
Bathythrix fragilis (Gravenhorst, 1829)
Bathythrix lacustris (Schmiedeknecht, 1905)
Bathythrix lamiinus (Thomson, 1884)
Bathythrix linearis (Gravenhorst, 1829)
Bathythrix pellucidator (Gravenhorst, 1829)
Bathythrix ruficaudatus (Bridgman, 1883)
Bathythrix tenerrimus (Gravenhorst, 1829)
Bathythrix tenuis (Gravenhorst, 1829)
Bathythrix thomsoni (Kerrich, 1942)
Bioblapsis polita (Vollenhoven, 1878)
Blapticus dentifer Thomson, 1888
Blapticus leucostomus Förster, 1871
Buathra laborator (Thunberg, 1822)
Buathra tarsoleuca (Schrank, 1781)

C

Caenocryptus rufiventris (Gravenhorst, 1829)
Caenocryptus striolatus Thomson, 1896
Callajoppa cirrogastra (Schrank, 1781)
Callajoppa exaltatoria (Panzer, 1804)
Campocraspedon arcanus (Stelfox, 1941)
Campocraspedon caudatus (Thomson, 1890)
Campodorus amictus (Holmgren, 1855)
Campodorus astutus (Holmgren, 1876)
Campodorus axillaris (Stephens, 1835)
Campodorus cailgatus (Gravenhorst, 1829)
Campodorus corrugatus (Holmgren, 1876)
Campodorus dorsalis (Gravenhorst, 1829)
Campodorus formosus (Gravenhorst, 1829)
Campodorus fuscipes (Holmgren, 1855)
Campodorus haematodes (Gravenhorst, 1829)
Campodorus hamulus (Gravenhorst, 1829)
Campodorus hosternus (Thomson, 1894)
Campodorus ignavus (Holmgren, 1855)
Campodorus incidens (Thomson, 1894)
Campodorus luctuosus (Holmgren, 1855)
Campodorus macuilcollis (Stephens, 1835)
Campodorus mixtus (Holmgren, 1855)
Campodorus molestus (Holmgren, 1855)
Campodorus nigridens (Thomson, 1894)
Campodorus patagiatus (Holmgren, 1876)
Campodorus peronatus (Marshall, 1876)
Campodorus pictipes (Habermehl, 1923)
Campodorus scapularis (Stephens, 1835)
Campodorus tristis (Holmgren, 1855)
Campodorus trochanteratus (Kriechbaumer, 1896)
Campodorus viduus (Holmgren, 1855)
Campoletis agilis (Holmgren, 1860)
Campoletis alienus (Brischke, 1880)
Campoletis annulatus (Gravenhorst, 1829)
Campoletis boops (Thomson, 1887)
Campoletis braccatus (Gmelin in Linnaeus, 1790)
Campoletis caedator (Gravenhorst, 1829)
Campoletis clausus (Brischke, 1880)
Campoletis cognatus (Tschek, 1871)
Campoletis coxalis (Brischke, 1880)
Campoletis crassicornis (Tschek, 1871)
Campoletis dilatator (Thunberg, 1822)
Campoletis erythropus (Thomson, 1887)
Campoletis farciatus (Bridgman, 1888)
Campoletis femoralis (Gravenhorst, 1829)
Campoletis fuscipes (Holmgren, 1855)
Campoletis holmgreni (Tschek, 1871)
Campoletis incisus (Bridgman, 1883)
Campoletis inquinatus (Holmgren, 1860)
Campoletis latrator Gravenhorst, 1829 misident.
Campoletis longulus (Thomson, 1887)
Campoletis posticus (Bridgman & Fitch, 1885)
Campoletis punctatus (Bridgman, 1886)
Campoletis rapax (Gravenhorst, 1829)
Campoletis raptor (Zetterstedt, 1838)
Campoletis thuringiacus (Schmiedeknecht, 1909)
Campoletis tricinctus (Gravenhorst, 1829)
Campoletis varicoxa (Thomson, 1887)
Campoletis vexans (Holmgren, 1860)
Campoletis viennensis (Gravenhorst, 1829)
Campoletis zonatus (Gravenhorst, 1829)
Campoplex abbreviatus (Brischke, 1880)
Campoplex angulatus (Thomson, 1887)
Campoplex borealis (Zetterstedt, 1838)
Campoplex cingulatus (Brischke, 1880)
Campoplex continuus (Thomson, 1887)
Campoplex coracinus (Thomson, 1887)
Campoplex cursitans (Holmgren, 1860)
Campoplex difformis (Gmelin in Linnaeus, 1790)
Campoplex ensator Gravenhorst, 1829
Campoplex fusciplica (Thomson, 1887)
Campoplex hadrocerus (Thomson, 1887)
Campoplex infernalis (Gravenhorst, 1820)
Campoplex lugubrinus (Holmgren, 1855)
Campoplex melanostictus Gravenhorst, 1829
Campoplex multicinctus Gravenhorst, 1829
Campoplex mutabilis (Holmgren, 1860)
Campoplex ovatus (Brischke, 1880)
Campoplex procerus (Brischke, 1880)
Campoplex psammae (Morley, 1915)
Campoplex rothii (Holmgren, 1855)
Campoplex ruficoxa (Thomson, 1887)
Campoplex striolatus (Thomson, 1887)
Campoplex tumidulus Gravenhorst, 1829
Campoplex unkingulatus (Schmiedeknecht, 1909)
Campoplex variabilis (Bridgman, 1886)
Carria paradoxa Schmiedeknecht, 1924
Casinaria affinis Tschek, 1871
Casinaria albipalpis (Gravenhorst, 1829)
Casinaria ischnogaster Thomson, 1887
Casinaria morionella Holmgren, 1860
Casinaria orbitalis (Gravenhorst, 1829)
Casinaria palhpes Brischke, 1880
Casinaria petiolaris (Gravenhorst, 1829)
Casinaria rufimanus (Gravenhorst, 1829)
Casinaria tenuiventris (Gravenhorst, 1829)
Casinaria vidua (Gravenhorst, 1829)
Catalytus fulveolatus (Gravenhorst, 1829)
Catalytus mangeri (Gravenhorst, 1829)
Catastenus fimoralis Förster, 1871
Centeterus confector (Gravenhorst, 1829)
Centeterus opprimator (Gravenhorst, 1820)
Charitopes brunneus (Morley, 1907)
Charitopes carri (Roman, 1923)
Charitopes chrysopae (Brischke, 1890)
Charitopes cynipinus (Thomson, 1884)
Charitopes melanogaster (Thomson, 1884)
Charitopes nitidus (Bridgman, 1889)
Charops cantator (Degeer, 1778)
Chasmias motatorius (Fabricius, 1775)
Chasmias paludator (Desvignes, 1854)
Chorinaeus brevicalcar Thomson, 1887
Chorinaeus cristator (Gravenhorst, 1829)
Chorinaeus fiavipes Bridgman, 1881
Chorinaeus funebris (Gravenhorst, 1829)
Chorinaeus hastianae Aeschlimann, 1975
Chorinaeus longicalcar Thomson, 1887
Chorinaeus longicornis Thomson, 1887
Chorinaeus talpa (Haliday, 1838)
Chorinaeus xanthopsis (Townes, 1946)
Cidaphus alarius (Gravenhorst, 1829)
Cidaphus atricillus (Haliday, 1838)
Cidaphus brischkei (Szapligeti, 1911)
Cladeutes discedens (Woldstedt, 1872)
Clistopyga incitator (Fabricius, 1793)
Clistopyga rufator Holmgren, 1856
Clistopyga sauberi Brauns, 1898
Coelichneumon billneatus (Gmelin in Linnaeus, 1790)
Coelichneumon comitator (Linnaeus, 1758)
Coelichneumon consimills (Wesmael, 1844)
Coelichneumon cyaniventris (Wesmael, 1859)
Coelichneumon deliratorius (Linnaeus, 1758)
Coelichneumon desinatorius (Thunberg, 1822)
Coelichneumon eximius (Stephens, 1835)
Coelichneumon fairificus (Wesmael, 1844)
Coelichneumon fasciatus (Gmelin in Linnaeus, 1790)
Coelichneumon haemorrhoidalls (Gravenhorst, 1820)
Coelichneumon leucocerus (Gravenhorst, 1820)
Coelichneumon microstictus (Gravenhorst, 1829)
Coelichneumon nigerrimus (Stephens, 1835)
Coelichneumon nigricornis (Wesmael, 1844)
Charitopes wesmaeliicidus (Roman, 1934)
Coelichneumon orbitator (Thunberg, 1822)
Coelichneumon purpurissatus Perkins, 1953
Coelichneumon ruficauda (Wesmael, 1844)
Coelichneumon serenus (Gravenhorst, 1820)
Coelichneumon solutus (Holmgren, 1864)
Coelichneumon truncatulus (Thomson, 1886)
Coleocentrus croceicornis (Gravenhorst, 1829)
Coleocentrus excitator (Poda, 1761)
Collyria coxator (Villers, 1789)
Collyria trichophthalma (Thomson, 1877)
Colocnema rufina (Gravenhorst, 1829)
Colpognathus celerator (Gravenhorst, 1807)
Colpognathus divisus Thomson, 1891
Colpotrochia cincta (Scopoli, 1763)
Cosmoconus ceratophorus (Thomson, 1888)
Cosmoconus elongator (Fabricius, 1775)
Cosmoconus meridionator
Cotiheresiarches dirus (Wesmael, 1853)
Cratichneumon albifrons (Stephens, 1835)
Cratichneumon clarigator (Wesmael, 1844)
Cratichneumon coruscator (Linnaeus, 1758)
Cratichneumon culex (Müller, 1776)
Cratichneumon fabricator (Fabricius, 1793)
Cratichneumon foersteri (Wesmael, 1848)
Cratichneumon fugitivus (Gravenhorst, 1829)
Cratichneumon infidus (Wesmael, 1848)
Cratichneumon jocularis (Wesmael, 1848)
Cratichneumon luteiventris (Gravenhorst, 1820)
Cratichneumon magus (Wesmael, 1855)
Cratichneumon pseudocryptus (Wesmael, 1857)
Cratichneumon rufifrons (Gravenhorst, 1829)
Cratichneumon semirufus (Gravenhorst, 1820)
Cratichneumon sicarius (Gravenhorst, 1829)
Cratichneumon varipes (Gravenhorst, 1829)
Cratichneumon versator (Thunberg, 1822)
Cratichneumon viator (Scopoli, 1763)
Cratocryptus furcator (Gravenhorst, 1829)
Cremastus bellicosus Gravenhorst, 1829
Cremastus buoliana (Curtis, 1854)
Cremastus cephalotes Sedivy, 1970
Cremastus crassicornis Thomson, 1890
Cremastus decorata (Gravenhorst, 1829)
Cremastus geminus Gravenhorst, 1829
Cremastus infirmus Gravenhorst, 1829
Cremastus interruptor (Gravenhorst, 1829)
Cremastus kratochvili Sedivy, 1970
Cremastus pungens Gravenhorst, 1829
Cremastus spectator Gravenhorst, 1829
Cremastus subnasuta (Thomson, 1890)
Cremnodes atricapillus (Gravenhorst, 1815)
Cremnodes riffipes (Perkins, 1962)
Crypteffigies albilarvatus (Gravenhorst, 1820)
Crypteffigies lanius (Gravenhorst, 1829)
Cryptopimpla anomala (Holmgren, 1860)
Cryptopimpla arvicola (Gravenhorst, 1829)
Cryptopimpla cailgata (Gravenhorst, 1829)
Cryptopimpla calceolata (Gravenhorst, 1829)
Cryptopimpla errabunda (Gravenhorst, 1829)
Cryptopimpla quadrilineata (Gravenhorst, 1829)
Ctenichneumon castigator (Fabricius, 1793)
Ctenichneumon celenae Perkins, 1953
Ctenichneumon devylderi (Holmgren, 1871)
Ctenichneumon divisorius (Gravenhorst, 1820)
Ctenichneumon edictorius (Linnaeus, 1758)
Ctenichneumon funereus (Geoffroy in Fourcroy, 1785)
Ctenichneumon inspector (Wesmael, 1844)
Ctenichneumon messorius (Gravenhorst, 1820)
Ctenichneumon nitens (Christ, 1791)
Ctenichneumon occisorius (Fabricius, 1793)
Ctenichneumon panzeri (Wesmael, 1844)
Ctenichneumon rubroater (Ratzeburg, 1852)
Ctenichneumon stagnicola (Thomson, 1888)
Cteniscus nigrifrons (Thomson, 1883)
Cteniscus pedatorius (Panzer, 1809)
Cteniscus scalaris (Gravenhorst, 1829)
Ctenochira aberrans (Ruthe, 1855)
Ctenochira angulata (Thomson, 1883)
Ctenochira angustata (Roman, 1909)
Ctenochira arcuata (Holmgren, 1855)
Ctenochira gilvipes (Holmgren, 1855)
Ctenochira haemosterna (Haliday, 1838)
Ctenochira marginata (Holmgren, 1855)
Ctenochira obscura (Stephens, 1835)
Ctenochira pastoralls (Gravenhorst, 1829)
Ctenochira pratensis (Gravenhorst, 1829)
Ctenochira propinqua (Gravenhorst, 1829)
Ctenochira pygobarba (Roman, 1937)
Ctenochira rufipes (Gravenhorst, 1829)
Ctenochira sanguinatoria (Ratzeburg, 1852)
Ctenochira sphaerocephala (Gravenhorst, 1829)
Ctenochira subrufa (Bridgman, 1888)
Ctenochira xanthopyga (Holmgren, 1855)
Ctenopelma lucifer (Gravenhorst, 1829)
Ctenopelma nigrum Holmgren, 1855
Ctenopelma tomentosum (Desvignes, 1856)
Ctenopelma xanthostigmum Holmgren, 1855
Cubocephalus anatorius (Gravenhorst, 1829)
Cubocephalus associator (Thunberg, 1822)
Cubocephalus brevicornis (Taschenberg, 1865)
Cubocephalus distinctor (Thunberg, 1822)
Cubocephalus erytlirinus (Gravenhorst, 1829)
Cubocephalus femoralis (Thomson, 1873)
Cubocephalus lacteator (Gravenhorst, 1829) ?misident.
Cubocephalus nigripes (Strobl, 1901)
Cubocephalus nigriventris (Thomson, 1874)
Cubocephalus stomaticus (Gravenhorst, 1829)
Cubocephalus subpetiolatus (Gravenhorst, 1829)
Cycasis rubiginosa (Gravenhorst, 1829)
Cyclolabus dubiosus Perkins, 1953
Cyclolabus nigricollis (Wesmael, 1844)
Cyclolabus pactor (Wesmael, 1844)
Cyllocerla accusator (Fabricius, 1793)
Cyllocerla caligata (Gravenhorst, 1829)
Cyllocerla marginator Schiødte, 1839
Cyllocerla melancholica (Gravenhorst, 1820)
Cymodusa antennator (Holmgren, 1855)
Cymodusa cruentata (Gravenhorst, 1829)
Cymodusa exilis Holmgren, 1860
Cymodusa flavjpes Brischke, 1880
Cymodusa fusciata (Bridgman & Fitch, 1885)
Cymodusa leucocera Holmgren, 1859

D

Delomerista laevis (Gravenhorst, 1829)
Delomerista mandibularis (Gravenhorst, 1829)
Delomerista novita (Cresson, 1870)
Delomerista pfankuchi (Brauns, 1905)
Demopheles corruptor (Taschenberg, 1865)
Deuteroxorides albitarsus (Gravenhorst, 1829)
Deuteroxorides elevator (Panzer, 1799)
Diacritus aciculatus (Vollenhoven, 1878)
Diadegma aculeata (Bridgman, 1889)
Diadegma agilis (Brischke, 1880)
Diadegma annulicrus (Thomson, 1887)
Diadegma annulipes (Bridgman, 1889)
Diadegma armillata (Gravenhorst, 1829)
Diadegma chrysostictos (Gmelin in Linnaeus, 1790)
Diadegma clavicornis (Brischke, 1880)
Diadegma coleophorarum (Ratzeburg, 1852)
Diadegma combinata (Holmgren, 1860)
Diadegma consumtor (Gravenhorst, 1829)
Diadegma crassa (Bridgman, 1889)
Diadegma elishae (Bridgman, 1884)
Diadegma erucator (Zetterstedt, 1838)
Diadegma eucerophaga Horstmann, 1969
Diadegma finestralis (Holmgren, 1860)
Diadegma gracilis (Gravenhorst, 1829)
Diadegma holopyga (Thomson, 1887)
Diadegma insectator (Schrank, 1781)
Diadegma interrupta (Holmgren, 1860)
Diadegma lateralis (Gravenhorst, 1829)
Diadegma latungula (Thomson, 1887)
Diadegma majalis (Gravenhorst, 1829)
Diadegma melania (Thomson, 1887)
Diadegma nana (Gravenhorst, 1829)
Diadegma neocerophaga Horstmann, 1969
Diadegma parvicaudo (Thomson, 1887)
Diadegma pusio (Holmgren, 1860)
Diadegma rufata (Bridgman, 1884)
Diadegma scotiae (Bridgman, 1889)
Diadegma sordipes (Thomson, 1887)
Diadegma tenuipes (Thomson, 1887)
Diadegma tripunctata (Bridgman, 1886)
Diadegma trochanterata (Thomson, 1887)
Diadegma truncata (Thomson, 1887)
Diadegma varians (Brischke, 1880)
Diadromus albinotatus (Gravenhorst, 1829)
Diadromus candidatus (Gravenhorst, 1829)
Diadromus collaris (Gravenhorst, 1829)
Diadromus quadriguttatus (Gravenhorst, 1829)
Diadromus subtilicornis (Gravenhorst, 1829)
Diadromus tenax Wesmael, 1844
Diadromus troglodytes (Gravenhorst, 1829)
Diadromus varicolor Wesmael, 1844
Diaglyptellana opacula (Thomson, 1884)
Diaglyptidea conformis (Gmelin in Linnaeus, 1790)
Diaglyptidea pallicarpus (Thomson, 1884)
Dialipsis communis (Förster, 1871)
Diaparsis carinifer (Thomson, 1889)
Diaparsis multiplicator Aubert, 1969
Diaparsis nutritor (Fabricius, 1804)
Diaparsis stramineipes (Brischke, 1880)
Dicaelotus cameroni Bridgman, 1881
Dicaelotus erythrostomus Wesmael, 1844
Dicaelotus fitchi Perkins, 1953
Dicaelotus inflexus Thomson, 1891
Dicaelotus morosus Wesmael, 1855
Dicaelotus orbitalis Thomson, 1891
Dicaelotus parvulus (Gravenhorst, 1829)
Dicaelotus pictus (Schmiedeknecht, 1903)
Dicaelotus pudibundus (Wesmael, 1844)
Dicaelotus pumilus (Gravenhorst, 1829)
Dicaelotus punctiventris (Thomson, 1891)
Dicaelotus ruficoxatus (Gravenhorst, 1829)
Dicaelotus rufoniger Berthoumieu, 1896
Dicaelotus suspectus Perkins, 1953
Dichrogaster aestivalls (Gravenhorst, 1829)
Dichrogaster liostylus (Thomson, 1885)
Dimophora robusta Brischke, 1880
Diphyus castanopyga (Stephens, 1835)
Diphyus gradatorius (Thunberg, 1822)
Diphyus indocills (Wesmael, 1844)
Diphyus longigena (Thomson, 1888)
Diphyus luctatorius (Linnaeus, 1758)
Diphyus margineguttatus (Gravenhorst, 1829)
Diphyus mercatorius (Fabricius, 1793)
Diphyus monitorius (Panzer, 1801)
Diphyus palliatorius (Gravenhorst, 1829)
Diphyus quadripunctorius (Müller, 1776)
Diphyus raptorius (Linnaeus, 1758)
Diphyus septemguttatus (Gravenhorst 1829)
Diphyus trifasciatus (Gravenhorst, 1829)
Diplazon alpinus (Holmgren, 1856)
Diplazon annulatus (Gravenhorst, 1829)
Diplazon deletus (Thomson, 1890)
Diplazon laetatorius (Fabricius, 1781)
Diplazon neoalpinus Zwakhals, 1979
Diplazon pectoratorius (Gravenhorst, 1829)
Diplazon scutatorius Teunissen, 1943
Diplazon tetragonus (Thunberg, 1822)
Diplazon tibiatorius (Thunberg, 1822)
Diplazon varicoxa (Thomson, 1890)
Dirophanes fulvitarsis (Wesmael, 1844)
Dirophanes rusticatus (Wesmael, 1844)
Dolichomitus agnoscendus (Roman, 1939)
Dolichomitus diversicostae (Perkins, 1943)
Dolichomitus imperator (Kriechbaumer, 1854)
Dolichomitus mesocentrus (Gravenhorst, 1829)
Dolichomitus messor (Gravenhorst, 1829)
Dolichomitus populneus (Ratzeburg, 1848)
Dolichomitus pterelas (Say, 1829)
Dolichomitus strobilellae (Linnaeus, 1758)
Dolichomitus terebrans (Ratzeburg, 1844)
Dolichomitus tuberculatus (Geoffroy in Fourcroy, 1785)
Dolophron pedellus (Holmgren, 1860)
Dreisbachia pictifrons (Thomson, 1877)
Dusona anceps (Holmgren, 1860)
Dusona angustata (Thomson, 1887)
Dusona angustifrons (Förster, 1868)
Dusona annexa (Förster, 1868)
Dusona aversa (Förster, 1868)
Dusona bucculenta (Holmgren, 1860)
Dusona carinifrons (Holmgren, 1860)
Dusona confusa (Förster, 1868)
Dusona contumax (Förster, 1868)
Dusona cultrator (Gravenhorst, 1829)
Dusona erythrogaster (Förster, 1868)
Dusona falcator (Fabricius, 1775)
Dusona foersteri (Roman, 1942)
Dusona incompleta (Bridgman, 1889)
Dusona infesta (Förster, 1868)
Dusona insignia (Förster, 1868)
Dusona lapponica (Holmgren, 1860)
Dusona latungula (Thomson, 1887)
Dusona leptogaster (Holmgren, 1860)
Dusona myrtilla (Desvignes, 1856)
Dusona nidulator (Fabricius, 1804)
Dusona notabilis (Förster, 1868)
Dusona opaca (Thomson, 1887)
Dusona oxyacanthae (Boie, 1855)
Dusona petiolator (Fabricius, 1804)
Dusona pugillator (Linnaeus, 1758)
Dusona remota (Förster, 1868)
Dusona rugifer (Förster, 1868)
Dusona rugulosa (Förster, 1868)
Dusona sobolicida (Förster, 1868)
Dusona stragifex (Förster, 1868)
Dusona subaequalis (Förster, 1868)
Dusona tenuis (Förster, 1868)
Dusona unicincta (Holmgren, 1872)
Dusona victor (Thunberg, 1822)
Dusona vigilator (Förster, 1868)
Dusona xenocampta (Förster, 1868)
Dusona zonella (Förster, 1868)
Dyspetes arrogator Heinrich, 1949

E

Echthrus reluctator (Linnaeus, 1758)
Eclytus exornatus (Gravenhorst, 1829)
Eclytus multicolor (Kreichbaumer, 1896)
Eclytus ornatus Holmgren, 1855
Ectopius rubellus (Gmelin in Linnaeus, 1790)
Enclisis macilentus (Gravenhorst, 1829)
Encrateola mediovittata (Schmiedeknecht, 1897)
Endasys brevis (Gravenhorst, 1829)
Endasys erythrogaster (Gravenhorst, 1829)
Endasys parviventris (Gravenhorst, 1829)
Endasys transverseareolatus (Strobl, 1901)
Endromopoda arundinator (Fabricius, 1804)
Endromopoda detrita (Holmgren, 1860)
Endromopoda nigricoxis (Ulbricht, 1910)
Endromopoda nitida (Brauns, 1898)
Endromopoda phragmitidis (Perkins, 1957)
Enicospilus combustus (Gravenhorst, 1829)
Enicospilus inflexus (Ratzeburg, 1844)
Enicospilus ramidulus (Linnaeus, 1758)
Enicospilus repentinus (Holmgren, 1860)
Enicospilus undulatus (Gravenhorst, 1829)
Enizemum nigricorne (Thomson, 1890)
Enizemum ornatum (Gravenhorst, 1829)
Entypoma robustum Förster, 1871
Entypoma suspiciosum (Förster, 1871)
Enytus apostatus (Gravenhorst, 1829)
Enytus neapostatus (Horstmann, 1969)
Eparces grandiceps Thomson, 1891
Ephialtes manifestator (Linnaeus, 1758)
Epitomus parvus Thomson, 1891
Epitomus proximus Perkins, 1953
Eremotylus marginatus (Jurine, 1807)
Eriborus dorsalis (Gravenhorst, 1829)
Eridolius alacer (Gravenhorst, 1829)
Eridolius aurifluus (Haliday, 1838)
Eridolius basalis (Stephens, 1835)
Eridolius bimaculatus (Holmgren, 1855)
Eridolius consobrinus (Holmgren, 1855)
Eridolius curtisii (Haliday, 1838)
Eridolius elegans (Stephens, 1835)
Eridolius flavomaculatus (Gravenhorst, 1829)
Eridolius gnathoxanthus (Gravenhorst, 1829)
Eridolius hofferi (Gregor, 1937)
Eridolius hostilis (Holmgren, 1855)
Eridolius limbatellus (Holmgren, 1855)
Eridolius lineolus (Stephens, 1835)
Eridolius marginatus (Thomson, 1883)
Eridolius mitigosus (Gravenhorst, 1829)
Eridolius pachysomus (Stephens, 1835)
Eridolius pictus (Gravenhorst, 1829)
Eridolius praeustus (Holmgren, 1855)
Eridolius romani (Kerrich, 1952)
Eridolius rufilabris (Holmgren, 1855)
Eridolius rufonotatus (Holmgren, 1855)
Eridolius ustulatus (Holmgren, 1855)
Eriplatys ardeicollis (Wesmael, 1844)
Eristicus clericus (Gravenhorst, 1829)
Erromenus analis Brischke, 1871
Erromenus bibulus Kasparyan, 1973
Erromenus brunnicans (Gravenhorst, 1829)
Erromenus calcator (Muller, 1776)
Erromenus fasciatus (Gravenhorst, 1829)
Erromenus junior (Thunberg, 1822)
Erromenus plebejus (Woldstedt, 1877)
Erromenus punctulatus Holmgren, 1855
Erromenus zonarius (Gravenhorst, 1820)
Ethelurgus sodalls (Taschenberg, 1865)
Ethelurgus vulnerator (Gravenhorst, 1829)
Euceros albitarsus Curtis, 1837
Euceros crassicornis Gravenhorst, 1829
Euceros pruinosus (Gravenhorst, 1829)
Euceros serricornis (Haliday, 1838)
Euceros unifasciatus Vollenhoven, 1878
Eudelus capreolus (Thomson, 1884)
Eudelus infirmus (Gravenhorst, 1829)
Eudelus scabriculus (Thomson, 1884)
Eupalamus lacteator (Gravenhorst, 1829)
Eupalamus wesmaeli Thomson, 1886
Eurylabus larvatus (Christ, 1791)
Eurylabus torvus Wesmael, 1844
Eurylabus tristis (Gravenhorst, 1829)
Euryproctus affinis Holmgren, 1855
Euryproctus alpinus Holmgren, 1855
Euryproctus annulatus (Gravenhorst, 1829)
Euryproctus crassicornis Thomson, 1889
Euryproctus geniculosus (Gravenhorst, 1829)
Euryproctus holmgreni Kerrich, 1942
Euryproctus infirus Thomson, 1889
Euryproctus mundus (Gravenhorst, 1829)
Euryproctus nemoralls (Geoffroy in Fourcroy, 1785)
Eusterinx divulgata Förster, 1871
Eusterinx obscurella Förster, 1871
Eusterinx tenuicincta (Förster, 1871)
Eutanyacra crispatorius (Linnaeus, 1758)
Eutanyacra glaucatorius (Fabricius, 1793)
Eutanyacra pallidicornis (Gravenhorst, 1829)
Eutanyacra pictus (Schrank, 1776)
Exaristes ruficollis (Gravenhorst, 1829)
Excavarus apiarius (Gravenhorst, 1829)
Exenterus abruptorius (Thunberg, 1822)
Exenterus airpersus Hartig, 1838
Exenterus amictorius (Panzer, 1801)
Exenterus confusus Kerrich
Exenterus oriolus Hartig, 1838
Exenterus tricolor Roman
Exenterus vellicatus Cushman
Exephanes amabilis Kriechbaumer, 1895
Exephanes caelebs Kriechbaumer, 1890
Exephanes ischioxanthus (Gravenhorst, 1829)
Exephanes occupator (Gravenhorst, 1829)
Exephanes ulbrichti Hinz, 1957
Exetastes adpressorius (Thunberg, 1822)
Exetastes atrator (Forster, 1771)
Exetastes calobatus Gravenhorst, 1829
Exetastes femorator Desvignes, 1856
Exetastes fornicator (Fabricius, 1781)
Exetastes illusor Gravenhorst, 1829
Exetastes laevigator (Villers, 1789)
Exetastes maurus Desvignes, 1856
Exetastes nigripes Gravenhorst, 1829
Exetastes ruficollis (Gravenhorst, 1829)
Exochus albicinctus Holmgren, 1873
Exochus alpinus (Zetterstedt, 1838)
Exochus britannicus Morley, 1911
Exochus carri Schmiedeknecht, 1924
Exochus decoratus Holmgren, 1873
Exochus erythronotus (Gravenhorst, 1820)
Exochus flavomarginatus Holmgren, 1855
Exochus fletcheri Bridgman, 1884
Exochus frontellus Holmgren, 1856
Exochus gravipes (Gravenhorst, 1820)
Exochus gravis Gravenhorst, 1829
Exochus intermedius Morley, 1911
Exochus lentipes Gravenhorst, 1829
Exochus lictor Haliday, 1838
Exochus mitratus Gravenhorst, 1829
Exochus nigripalpis Thomson, 1887
Exochus notatus Holmgren, 1856
Exochus pectoralis Haliday, 1838
Exochus pictus Holmgren, 1856
Exochus prosopius Gravenhorst, 1829
Exochus rubroater Schmiedeknecht, 1924
Exochus septentrionalis Holmgren, 1873
Exochus tibialis Holmgren, 1856
Exyston calcaratus Thomson, 1883
Exyston pratorum (Woldstedt, 1874)
Exyston sponsorius (Fabricius, 1781)
Exyston subnitidus (Gravenhorst, 1829)

F

Flavopimpla cicatricosa (Ratzeburg, 1848)
Fredegunda diluta (Ratzeburg, 1852)

G

Gambrus brevispinus (Thomson, 1896)
Gambrus carnifex (Gravenhorst, 1829)
Gambrus incubitor (Linnaeus, 1758)
Gambrus ornatulus (Thomson, 1873)
Gambrus superus (Thomson, 1896)
Gelis acarorum (Linnaeus, 1758)
Gelis agilIs (Fabricius, 1775)
Gelis albipalpus (Thomson, 1884)
Gelis alpivagus (Strobl, 1901)
Gelis analis (Förster, 1850)
Gelis anthracinus (Förster, 1850)
Gelis aquisgranensis (Förster, 1850)
Gelis areator (Panzer, 1804)
Gelis attentus (Förster, 1850)
Gelis bicolor (Villers, 1789)
Gelis brevis (Bridgman, 1883)
Gelis canailculatus (Förster, 1850)
Gelis cautus (Förster, 1850)
Gelis cinctus (Linnaeus, 1758)
Gelis comes (Förster, 1850)
Gelis confusus (Bridgman, 1883)
Gelis corruptor (Förster, 1850)
Gelis cursitans (Fabricius, 1775)
Gelis detritus (Förster, 1850)
Gelis distinctus (Förster, 1850)
Gelis fallax (Förster, 1850)
Gelis foersteri (Bridgman, 1886)
Gelis formicarius (Linnaeus, 1758)
Gelis fraudulentus (Förster, 1850)
Gelis frstinans (Fabricius, 1798)
Gelis gentills (Förster, 1850)
Gelis gonatopinus (Thomson, 1884)
Gelis gracills (Förster, 1850)
Gelis hieracii (Bridgman, 1883)
Gelis higubris (Förster, 1850)
Gelis hostitis (Förster, 1850)
Gelis impotens (Förster, 1850)
Gelis inandibularis (Thomson, 1884)
Gelis incubitor (Förster, 1850)
Gelis indigator (Förster, 1851)
Gelis inermis (Förster, 1850)
Gelis insolens (Förster, 1850)
Gelis instabilis (Förster, 1850)
Gelis kiesenwetteri (Förster, 1850)
Gelis longicaudus (Thomson, 1884)
Gelis lucidulus (Förster, 1850)
Gelis melanocephalus (Schrank, 1781)
Gelis micrurus (Förster, 1850)
Gelis modestus (Förster, 1850)
Gelis muelleri (Förster, 1850)
Gelis nigricornis (Förster, 1850)
Gelis nigritus (Förster, 1850)
Gelis ovatus (Bridgman, 1883)
Gelis pedicularius (Fabricius, 1793)
Gelis pilosus (Capron, 1888)
Gelis proximus (Förster, 1850)
Gelis prudens (Förster, 1851)
Gelis puilcarius (Fabricius, 1793)
Gelis pumilus (Förster, 1850)
Gelis quaesitorius (Förster, 1850)
Gelis rufipes (Förster, 1850)
Gelis rufulus (Förster, 1850)
Gelis rugifer (Thomson, 1884)
Gelis spinulus (Thomson, 1884)
Gelis stevenii (Gravenhorst, 1829)
Gelis sylvicolus (Förster, 1850)
Gelis tener (Förster, 1850)
Gelis terebrator (Ratzeburg, 1848)
Gelis timidus (Förster, 1850)
Gelis tonsus (Förster, 1850)
Gelis unicolor (Förster, 1850)
Gelis vagans (Olivier, 1792)
Gelis vagantiformis (Bridgman, 1886)
Gelis vigil (Förster, 1850)
Gelis vulnerans (Förster, 1850)
Gelis vulpinus (Gravenhorst, 1829)
Gelis zonatus (Förster, 1850)
Giraudia gyratoria (Thunberg, 1822)
Giraudia risescens (Gravenhorst, 1829)
Glyphicnemis clypealls (Thomson, 1883)
Glyphicnemis gracills (Kriechbaumer, 1893)
Glyphicnemis profligator (Fabricius, 1775)
Glyphicnemis rubricator (Thunberg, 1822)
Glyphicnemis rustica (Habermehl, 1912)
Glyphicnemis senilis (Gmelin in Linnaeus, 1790)
Glyphicnemis sufiblciensis (Morley, 1907)
Glyphicnemis vagabunda (Gravenhorst, 1829)
Glyphicnemis varipes (Gravenhorst, 1829)
Glypta annulata Bridgman, 1890
Glypta bicornis Boie, 1850
Glypta bifoveolata Gravenhorst, 1829
Glypta ceratites (Gravenhorst, 1829)
Glypta elongata Holmgren, 1860
Glypta extincta Ratzeburg, 1852
Glypta femorator Desvignes, 1856
Glypta flilcornis Thomson, 1887
Glypta fronticornis (Gravenhorst, 1829)
Glypta haesitator Gravenhorst, 1829
Glypta incisa Gravenhorst, 1829
Glypta lineata Desvignes, 1856
Glypta longicauda Hartig, 1838
Glypta lugubrina Holmgren, 1860
Glypta mensurator (Fabricius, 1775)
Glypta monoceros Gravenhorst, 1829
Glypta nigrina Desvignes, 1856
Glypta parvicaudata Bridgman, 1889
Glypta parvicornuta Bridgman, 1886
Glypta pedata Desvignes, 1856
Glypta punctifrons Bridgman, 1890
Glypta resinana Hartig, 1838
Glypta rostrata Holmgren, 1860
Glypta rubicunda Bridgman, 1890
Glypta rufata Bridgman, 1888
Glypta scalaris Gravenhorst, 1829
Glypta sculpturata Gravenhorst, 1829
Glypta similis Bridgman, 1886
Glypta tenuicornis Thomson, 1889
Glypta teres Gravenhorst, 1829
Glypta trochanterata Bridgman, 1886
Glypta vulnerator Gravenhorst, 1829
Glyptorhaestus punctulatus (Woldstedt, 1877)
Gnotus chionops (Gravenhorst, 1829)
Gnotus tenuipes (Gravenhorst, 1829)
Gnypetomorpha obscura (Bridgman, 1883)
Goedartia alboguttata (Gravenhorst, 1829)
Gonolochus caudatus (Holmgren, 1860)
Gonotypus melanostoma (Thomson, 1887)
Gonotypus robustus (Woldstedt, 1876)
Gravenhorstia cerinops (Gravenhorst, 1829)
Gravenhorstia melanobata (Gravenhorst, 1829)
Gravenhorstia picta Boie, 1856
Gregopimpla inquisitor (Scopoli, 1763)
Grypocentrus albipes Ruthe, 1855
Grypocentrus apicalis
Grypocentrus basalls Ruthe, 1855
Grypocentrus cinctellus Ruthe, 1855
Grypocentrus incisulus Ruthe, 1855
Gunomeria macrodactylus

H

Habronyx biguttatus (Gravenhorst, 1829)
Habronyx canaliculatus (Ratzeburg, 1844)
Habronyx heroes (Wesmael, 1849)
Habronyx perspicuus (Wesmael, 1849)
Hadrodactylus bidentulus Thomson, 1883
Hadrodactylus confusus (Holmgren, 1856)
Hadrodactylus faciator (Thunberg, 1822)
Hadrodactylus fugax (Gravenhorst, 1829)
Hadrodactylus gracilipes Thomson, 1883
Hadrodactylus gracilis (Stephens, 1835)
Hadrodactylus marginatus (Bridgman, 1886)
Hadrodactylus paludicolus (Holmgren, 1855)
Hadrodactylus riphac (Geoffroy in Fourcroy, 1785)
Hadrodactylus ventralls (Curtis, 1837)
Hadrodactylus villosulus Thomson, 1883
Helcostizus restaurator (Fabricius, 1775)
Helictes borealis (Holmgren, 1855)
Helictes coxalis (Förster, 1871)
Helictes erythrostomus (Gmelin in Linnaeus, 1790)
Hemichneumon elongatus (Ratzeburg, 1852)
Hemiteles bipunctator (Thunberg, 1822)
Hemiteles piceus (Bridgman, 1883)
Hemiteles similis (Gmelin in Linnaeus, 1790)
Hepiopelmus melanogaster (Gmelin in Linnaeus, 1790)
Hepiopelmus variegatorius (Panzer, 1800)
Hercus fontinalis (Holmgren, 1855)
Heresiarches eudoxius (Wesmael, 1844)
Herpestomus arridens (Gravenhorst, 1829)
Herpestomus brunnicornis (Gravenhorst, 1829)
Herpestomus nasutus Wesmael, 1844
Herpestomus wesmaeli Perkins, 1953
Heterischnus nigricollis (Wesmael, 1844)
Heterischnus pulex (Müller, 1776)
Heterischnus thoracicus (Gravenhorst, 1829)
Heterocola linguaria (Haliday, 1838)
Heteropelma amictum (Fabricius, 1775)
Heteropelma calcator (Wesmael, 1849)
Himerta defectiva (Gravenhorst, 1820)
Himerta sepulchralls (Holmgren, 1876)
Homaspis subalpina Schmiedeknecht, 1913
Homotherus locutor (Thunberg, 1822)
Homotropus collinus (Stelfox, 1941)
Homotropus crassicornis (Thomson, 1890)
Homotropus crassicrus (Thomson, 1890)
Homotropus dimidiatus (Schrank, 1802)
Homotropus elegans (Gravenhorst, 1829)
Homotropus fissorius (Gravenhorst, 1829)
Homotropus gracilentus (Holmgren, 1856)
Homotropus impolitus (Stelfox, 1941)
Homotropus incisus (Thomson, 1890)
Homotropus longiventris (Thomson, 1890)
Homotropus megaspis (Thomson, 1890)
Homotropus neopulcher Horstmann, 1968
Homotropus nigritarsus (Gravenhorst, 1829)
Homotropus pallipes (Gravenhorst, 1829)
Homotropus pictus (Gravenhorst, 1829)
Homotropus reflexus (Morley, 1906)
Homotropus signatus (Gravenhorst, 1829)
Homotropus simulans (Stelfox, 1941)
Homotropus strigator (Fabricius, 1793)
Homotropus subopacus (Stelfox, 1941)
Homotropus sundevalli (Holmgren, 1856)
Homotropus tarsatorius (Panzer, 1809)
Homotropus tricolor (Stelfox, 1941)
Hoplismenus albifrons Gravenhorst, 1829
Hoplismenus bidentatus (Gmelin in Linnaeus, 1790)
Hybomischos septemcinctorius (Thunberg, 1822)
Hybophanes ops (Morley, 1908)
Hybophanes scabriculus (Gravenhorst, 1829)
Hypamblys albopictus (Gravenhorst, 1829)
Hypamblys buccatus (Holmgren, 1855)
Hypamblys transfuga (Holmgren, 1855)
Hyperacmus crassicornis (Gravenhorst, 1829)
Hyposoter albonotatus (Bridgman, 1889)
Hyposoter anglicanus (Habermehl, 1923)
Hyposoter barrettii (Bridgman, 1881)
Hyposoter brischkei (Bridgman, 1882)
Hyposoter carbonarius (Ratzeburg, 1844)
Hyposoter didymator (Thunberg, 1822)
Hyposoter discedens (Schmiedeknecht, 1909)
Hyposoter dolosus (Gravenhorst, 1829)
Hyposoter ebeninus (Gravenhorst, 1829)
Hyposoter fugitivus (Say, 1835)
Hyposoter fitchil (Bridgman, 1881)
Hyposoter henaultii (Desvignes, 1856)
Hyposoter horticola(Gravenhorst, 1829)
Hyposoter notatus (Gravenhorst, 1829)
Hyposoter orbator (Gravenhorst, 1829)
Hyposoter placidus (Desvignes, 1856)
Hyposoter virginalis (Gravenhorst, 1829)
Hypsantyx impressus (Gravenhorst, 1829)
Hypsantyx lituratorius (Linnaeus, 1761)
Hypsicera curvator (Fabricius, 1793)
Hypsicera femoralis (Geoffroy in Fourcroy, 1785)
Hypsicera flaviceps (Ratzeburg, 1852)

I

Ichneumon albicollis Wesmael, 1857
Ichneumon albiger Wesmael, 1844
Ichneumon analis Gravenhorst, 1829
Ichneumon aquilonius Perkins, 1953
Ichneumon bellipes Wesmael, 1844
Ichneumon bucculentus Wesmael, 1844
Ichneumon caloscelis Wesmael, 1844
Ichneumon camelinus Wesmael, 1844
Ichneumon caproni Perkins, 1953
Ichneumon cessator Müller, 1776
Ichneumon computatorius Müller, 1776
Ichneumon confusor Gravenhorst, 1820
Ichneumon crassifemur Thomson, 1886
Ichneumon didymus Gravenhorst, 1829
Ichneumon emancipatus Wesmael, 1844
Ichneumon equitatorius Panzer, 1786
Ichneumon eurycerus Thomson, 1890
Ichneumon exilicornis Wesmael, 1857
Ichneumon extensorius Linnaeus, 1758
Ichneumon femorator Kirby, 1802 nom dub.
Ichneumon formasus Gravenhorst, 1829
Ichneumon fuscatus Gmelin in Linnaeus, 1790
Ichneumon gracilentus Wesmael, 1844
Ichneumon gracilicornis Gravenhorst, 1829
Ichneumon haereticus (Wesmael, 1854)
Ichneumon ignobills Wesmael, 1855
Ichneumon insidiosus Wesmael, 1844
Ichneumon latrator Fabricius, 1781
Ichneumon lautatorius Desvignes, 1856
Ichneumon ligatorius Thunberg, 1822
Ichneumon lugens Gravenhorst, 1829
Ichneumon megapodius Heinrich, 1949
Ichneumon melanotis Holmgren, 1864
Ichneumon memorator Wesmael, 1844
Ichneumon minutorius Desvignes, 1856
Ichneumon molitorius Linnaeus, 1761
Ichneumon nereni Thomson, 1887
Ichneumon primatorius Forster, 1771
Ichneumon quartanus Perkins, 1953
Ichneumon rufidorsatus Bridgman, 1888
Ichneumon sarcitorius Linnaeus, 1758
Ichneumon septentrionalis Holmgren, 1864
Ichneumon spurius Wesmael, 1848
Ichneumon stramentarius Gravenhorst, 1820
Ichneumon subquadratus Thomson, 1887
Ichneumon suspiciosus Wesmael, 1844
Ichneumon terminatorius Gravenhorst, 1820
Ichneumon tuberculipes Wesmael, 1848
Ichneumon validicornis Holmgren, 1864
Ichneumon vulneratorius Zetterstedt, 1838
Ichneumon walkeri Wesmael, 1848
Ichneumon xanthorius Forster, 1771
Idiogramma euryops Schmiedeknecht, 1888
Idiolispa analis (Gravenhorst, 1807)
Ischnoceros caligatus (Gravenhorst, 1829)
Ischnoceros rusticus (Geoffroy in Fourcroy, 1785)
Ischnus alternator (Gravenhorst, 1829)
Ischnus inquisitorius (Müller, 1776)
Ischnus migrator (Fabricius, 1775)
Ischnus minutorius (Fabricius, 1804)
Iseropus stercorator (Fabricius, 1793)
Itamoplex apparitorius (Villers, 1789)
Itamoplex armator (Fabricius, 1804)
Itamoplex attentorius (Panzer, 1804)
Itamoplex diancie (Gravenhorst, 1829)
Itamoplex inculcator (Linnaeus, 1758)
Itamoplex minator (Gravenhorst, 1829)
Itamoplex moschator (Fabricius, 1787)
Itamoplex spinosus (Gravenhorst, 1829)
Itamoplex spiralis (Geoffroy in Fourcroy, 1785)
Itamoplex titubator (Thunberg, 1822)
Itamoplex tuberculatus (Gravenhorst, 1829)
Itamoplex viduatorius (Fabricius, 1804)
Itoplectis alternans (Gravenhorst, 1829)
Itoplectis aterrima Jussila, 1965
Itoplectis clavicornis (Thomson, 1889)
Itoplectis insignis Perkins, 1957
Itoplectis maculator (Fabricius, 1775)
Itoplectis melanocephala (Gravenhorst, 1829)

J

Javra anomala (Morley, 1908)

K

Kristotomus laetus (Gravenhorst, 1829)
Kristotomus laticeps (Gravenhorst, 1829)
Kristotomus pumilio (Holmgren, 1855)
Kristotomus ridibundus (Gravenhorst, 1829)
Kristotomus triangulatorius (Gravenhorst, 1829)

L

Labrossyta scotoptera (Gravenhorst, 1820)
Lagarotis debitor (Thunberg, 1822)
Lagarotis semicaligatus (Gravenhorst, 1820)
Lamachus eques (Hartig, 1838)
Lamachus pini (Bridgman, 1882)
Lamachus virgultorum (Gravenhorst, 1829)
Lathrolestes bipunctatus (Bridgman, 1886)
Lathrolestes ensator (Brauns, 1898)
Lathrolestes luteolator (Gravenhorst, 1829)
Lathrolestes macropygus (Holmgren, 1855)
Lathrolestes marginatus (Thomson, 1883)
Lathrolestes minutus (Bridgman, 1888)
Lathrolestes orbitalls (Gravenhorst, 1829)
Lathrolestes pleuralis (Thomson, 1883)
Lathrolestes ungularis (Thomson, 1883)
Lathrostizus lugens (Gravenhorst, 1829)
Lathrostizus sternocerus (Thomson, 1887)
Leipaulus ridibundus (Gravenhorst, 1829)
Leptacoenites frauenfeldi (Tschek, 1868)
Leptacoenites notabilis (Desvignes 1856)
Limerodes arctiventris (Boie, 1841)
Limerodops elongatus (Brischke, 1878)
Limerodops subsericans (Gravenhorst, 1820)
Linycus exhortator (Fabricius, 1787)
Liotryphon agnoscendus (Roman, 1939)
Liotryphon caudatus (Ratzeburg, 1848)
Liotryphon crassisetus (Thomson, 1877)
Liotryphon punctulatus (Ratzeburg, 1848)
Liotryphon ruficollis (Desvignes, 1856)
Liotryphon strobilellae (Linnaeus, 1758)
Lissonota agnata Gravenhorst, 1829
Lissonota argiola Gravenhorst, 1829
Lissonota bellator Gravenhorst, 1829
Lissonota bilineata Gravenhorst, 1829
Lissonota buccator (Thunberg, 1822)
Lissonota carbonaria Holmgren, 1860
Lissonota catenator (Panzer, 1804)
Lissonota clypealls Thomson, 1877
Lissonota coracina (Gmelin)
Lissonota cylindrator (Fabricius, 1787)
Lissonota deversor Gravenhorst, 1829
Lissonota digestor (Thunberg, 1822)
Lissonota distincta Bridgman, 1889
Lissonota dubia Holmgren, 1855
Lissonota femorata Holmgren, 1860
Lissonota fletcheri Bridgman, 1882
Lissonota folti Thomson, 1877
Lissonota formosa Bridgman, 1888
Lissonota frontalls (Desvignes, 1856)
Lissonota fulvipes (Desvignes, 1856)
Lissonota fundator (Thunberg, 1822)
Lissonota funebris Habermehl, 1923
Lissonota halldayi  Holmgren, 1860
Lissonota ilnearis Gravenhorst, 1829
Lissonota impressor Gravenhorst, 1829
Lissonota insignita Gravenhorst, 1829
Lissonota leucogona Gravenhorst, 1829
Lissonota lineata Gravenhorst, 1829
Lissonota maculata Brischke, 1864
Lissonota nigridens Thomson, 1889
Lissonota nitida Bridgman, 1886
Lissonota paffardi (Morley, 1908)
Lissonota palpalis Thomson, 1889
Lissonota parallela Gravenhorst, 1829
Lissonota quadrinotata Gravenhorst, 1829
Lissonota saturator (Thunberg, 1822)
Lissonota segmentator (Fabricius, 1793)
Lissonota semirufa (Desvignes, 1856)
Lissonota setosa (Geoffroy in Fourcroy, 1785)
Lissonota stigmator Aubert, 1972
Lissonota subaciculata Bridgman, 1886
Lissonota trochanterator Aubert, 1972
Lissonota unicincta Holmgren, 1860
Lissonota variabilis Holmgren, 1860
Lissonota varipes (Desvignes, 1856)
Lissonota versicolor Holmgren, 1860
Listrodromus nycihemerus (Gravenhorst, 1820)
Listrognathus mactator (Thunberg, 1822)
Lophyroplectus luteator (Thunberg, 1822)
Lycorina triangulifera Holmgren, 1859
Lysibia nana (Gravenhorst, 1829)
Lysibia proxima (Perkins, 1962)

M

Macrus parvulus (Gravenhorst, 1829)
Mastrus areolaris (Thomson, 1884)
Mastrus armatus (Gravenhorst, 1829)
Mastrus auriculatus (Thomson, 1884)
Mastrus castaneus (Taschenberg, 1865)
Mastrus coriarius (Taschenberg, 1865)
Mastrus gallicolus (Bridgman, 1880)
Mastrus incisus (Bridgman, 1883)
Mastrus inimicus (Gravenhorst, 1829)
Mastrus niger (Bridgman, 1883)
Mastrus nigriventris (Thomson, 1884)
Mastrus westoni (Bridgman, 1880)
Medophron afflictor (Gravenhorst, 1829)
Medophron mixtus (Bridgman, 1883)
Megaplectes monticola (Gravenhorst, 1829)
Megastylus cruentator Schiødte, 1838
Megastylus excubitor (Förster, 1871)
Megastylus fiavopictus (Gravenhorst, 1829)
Megastylus impressor Schiødte, 1838
Megastylus pectoralis (Förster, 1871)
Megastylus subtiliventris (Förster, 1871)
Melanichneumon leucocheilus (Wesmael, 1844)
Meloboris collector (Thunberg, 1822)
Meloboris crassicornis (Gravenhorst, 1829)
Meloboris dorsalis (Gravenhorst, 1829)
Meloboris gracilis Holmgren, 1860
Meloboris grisescens (Gravenhorst, 1829)
Meloboris hydropota (Holmgren, 1860)
Meloboris hygrobia Thomson, 1887
Meloboris ischnocera Thomson, 1887
Meloboris litoralis (Holmgren, 1860)
Meloboris neglecta (Habermehl, 1923)
Meloboris stagnalis (Holmgren, 1855)
Meringopus cyanator (Gravenhorst, 1829)
Meringopus titillator (Linnaeus, 1758)
Mesochorus aciculatus Bridgman, 1881
Mesochorus alpigenus Strobl, 1904
Mesochorus angustatus Thomson, 1886
Mesochorus anomalus Holmgren, 1860
Mesochorus arenarius (Haliday, 1838)
Mesochorus basalis Curtis, 1833
Mesochorus brevipetiolatus Ratzeburg, 1844
Mesochorus confusus Holmgren, 1860
Mesochorus crassicrus Thomson, 1886
Mesochorus discitergus (Say, 1836)
Mesochorus formosus Bridgman, 1882
Mesochorus fulgurans Curtis, 1833
Mesochorus fuscicornis Brischke, 1880
Mesochorus giberius (Thunberg, 1822)
Mesochorus globulator (Thunberg, 1822)
Mesochorus gracilentus Brischke, 1880
Mesochorus nigripes Ratzeburg, 1852
Mesochorus olerum Curtis, 1833
Mesochorus orbitalis Holmgren, 1860
Mesochorus pallidus Brischke, 1880
Mesochorus pectimpes Bridgman, 1883
Mesochorus pectoralis Ratzeburg, 1844
Mesochorus pictilis Holmgren, 1860
Mesochorus politus Gravenhorst, 1829
Mesochorus semirufus Holmgren, 1860
Mesochorus sylvarum Curtis, 1833
Mesochorus tachypus Holmgren, 1860
Mesochorus temporalis Thomson, 1886
Mesochorus tenuiscapus Thomson, 1886
Mesochorus testaceus Gravenhorst, 1829
Mesochorus tetricus Holmgren, 1860
Mesochorus velox Holmgren, 1860
Mesochorus vittator (Zetterstedt, 1838)
Mesochorus vitticollis Holmgren, 1860
Mesoleius armillatorius (Gravenhorst, 1807)
Mesoleius aullcus (Gravenhorst, 1829)
Mesoleius dubius Holmgren, 1855
Mesoleius filicornis Holmgren, 1876
Mesoleius flavopictus (Gravenhorst, 1829)
Mesoleius frenalis Thomson, 1894
Mesoleius furax Holmgren, 1855
Mesoleius immarginatus Thomson, 1894
Mesoleius leptogaster Holmgren, 1855
Mesoleius melanoleucus (Gravenhorst, 1829)
Mesoleius nivalis Holmgren, 1855
Mesoleius opticus (Gravenhorst, 1829)
Mesoleius placidus Holmgren, 1855
Mesoleius pyriformis (Ratzeburg, 1852)
Mesoleius tenthredinis Morley in Hewitt, 1912
Mesoleius tenuiventris Holmgren, 1856
Mesoleius varicoxa (Thomson, 1894)
Mesoleius variegatus (Jurine, 1807)
Mesoleptidea bipunctata (Gravenhorst, 1829)
Mesoleptidea cingulata (Gravenhorst, 1829)
Mesoleptidea hilaris (Gravenhorst, 1829)
Mesoleptidea prosoleuca (Gravenhorst, 1829)
Mesoleptidea stallii (Holmgren, 1856)
Mesoleptidea xanthostigma (Gravenhorst, 1829)
Mesoleptus ambiguus (Förster, 1876)
Mesoleptus flilcornis (Thomson, 1884)
Mesoleptus laevigatus (Gravenhorst, 1820)
Mesoleptus marginatus (Thomson, 1884)
Mesoleptus petiolaris (Thomson, 1884)
Mesoleptus ripicolus (Thomson, 1884)
Mesoleptus sollicitus (Förster, 1876)
Mesoleptus splendens Gravenhorst, 1829
Mesoleptus transversor (Thunberg, 1822)
Mesostenidea ligator (Gravenhorst, 1829)
Mesostenidea obnoxius (Gravenhorst, 1829)
Mesostenus transfuga Gravenhorst, 1829
Metopius anxius Wesmael, 1849
Metopius croceicornis Thomson, 1887
Metopius dentatus (Fabricius, 1779)
Metopius dissectorius (Panzer, 1805-1806)
Metopius leiopygus Förster, 1850
Metopius pinatorius Brullé, 1846
Mevesia arguta (Wesmael, 1844)
Mevesia guttata Perkins, 1953
Microdiaparsis microcephalus (Gravenhorst, 1829)
Microdiaparsis neoversutus (Horstmann, 1967)
Microdiaparsis versutus (Holmgren, 1860)
Microleptes aquisgranensis (Förster, 1871)
Microleptes egregius (Schmiedeknecht, 1924)
Microleptes splendidulus Gravenhorst, 1829
Micrope macilenta (Wesmael, 1844)
Misetus oculatus Wesmael, 1844
Monoblastus brachyacanthus (Omelin in Linnaeus, 1790)
Monoblastus luteomarginarus (Gravenhorst, 1829)
Monoblastus marginellus (Gravenhorst, 1829)
Monoblastus proditor (Gravenhorst, 1829)

N

Nanodiaparsis frontellus (Holmgren, 1860)
Neliopisthus elegans (Ruthe, 1855)
Nematomicrus tenellus Wesmael, 1844
Nematopodius formosus Gravenhorst, 1829
Nemeritis caudatula Thomson, 1887
Nemeritis lativentris Thomson, 1887
Nemeritis macrocentra (Gravenhorst, 1829)
Nemeritis stenura Thomson, 1881
Neorhacodes ensilni (Ruschka, 1922)
Neotypus nobilitator (Gravenhorst, 1807)
Neoxorides nitens (Gravenhorst, 1829)
Nepiesta mandibularis (Holmgren, 1860)
Netelia cristatus (Thomson, 1888)
Netelia dilatatus sens. str. (Thomson, 1888)
Netelia fuscicornis (Holmgren, 1858)
Netelia latungulus (Thomson, 1888)
Netelia melanurus (Thomson, 1888)
Netelia nigricarpus (Thomson, 1888)
Netelia ocellaris (Thomson, 1888)
Netelia opaculus (Thomson, 1888)
Netelia ornatus (Vollenhoven, 1873)
Netelia tarsatus (Brischke, 1880)
Netelia vinulae (Scopoli, 1763)
Netelia virgatus (Geoffroy in Fourcroy, 1785)
Neurateles britteni (Waterson, 1929)
Notopygus emarginatus Holmgren, 1855
Notosemus bohemani (Wesmael, 1855)

O

Obisiphaga stenoptera (Marshall, 1868)
Odontocolon dentipes (Gmelin in Linnaeus, 1790)
Odontocolon quercinus (Thomson, 1877)
Oedemopsis scabricula (Gravenhorst, 1829)
Oiorhinus pallipalpis Wesmael, 1844
Olesicampe argentata (Gravenhorst, 1829)
Olesicampe auctor (Gravenhorst, 1829)
Olesicampe buccata (Thomson, 1887)
Olesicampe cavigena (Thomson, 1887)
Olesicampe clandestina (Holmgren, 1860)
Olesicampe cothurnata (Holmgren, 1860)
Olesicampe crassitarsis (Thomson, 1887)
Olesicampe erythropyga (Holmgren, 1860)
Olesicampe forticostata (Schmiedeknecht, 1909)
Olesicampe fulcrans (Thomson, 1887)
Olesicampe fulviventris (Gmelin in Linnaeus, 1790)
Olesicampe geniculella (Thomson, 1887)
Olesicampe gracilipes (Thomson, 1887)
Olesicampe hyalinata (Holmgren, 1860)
Olesicampe incrassator (Holmgren, 1855)
Olesicampe longipes (Müller, 1776)
Olesicampe luteipes (Thomson, 1887)
Olesicampe nigroplica (Thomson, 1887)
Olesicampe pagana (Holmgren, 1860)
Olesicampe paludicola (Holmgren, 1860)
Olesicampe praecox (Holmgren, 1860)
Olesicampe retusa (Thomson, 1887)
Olesicampe sericea (Holmgren, 1855)
Olesicampe simplex (Thomson, 1887)
Olesicampe subcallosa (Thomson, 1887)
Olesicampe vexata (Holmgren, 1860)
Olesicampe vitripennis (Holmgren, 1860)
Olethrodotis modestus (Gravenhorst, 1829)
Opheltes glaucopterus (Linnaeus, 1758)
Ophion brevicornis Morley, 1915
Ophion costatus Ratzeburg, 1848
Ophion crassicornis Brock, 1982
Ophion forticornis Morley, 1915
Ophion longigena Thomson, 1888
Ophion luteus (Linnaeus, 1758)
Ophion minutus Kriechbaumer, 1879
Ophion mocsaryi Brauns, 1889
Ophion obscuratus Fabricius, 1798
Ophion parvulus Kriechbaumer, 1879
Ophion perkinsi Brock, 1982
Ophion pteridis Kriechbaumer, 1879
Ophion scuteltaris Thomson, 1888
Ophion slaviceki Kriechbaumer, 1892
Ophion ventricosus Gravenhorst, 1829
Oresbius arridens (Gravenhorst, 1829)
Oresbius castaneus Marshall, 1867
Oresbius galactinus (Gravenhorst, 1829)
Oresbius nivalls (Zetterstedt, 1838)
Oresbius nycthemerus (Gravenhorst, 1829)
Oronotus binotatus (Gravenhorst, 1829)
Orotylus mitis (Wesmael, 1848)
Orthizema hadrocerum (Thomson, 1884)
Orthizema rugipectum (Thomson, 1884)
Orthizema sabannulatum (Bridgman, 1883)
Orthocentrus asper (Gravenhorst, 1829)
Orthocentrus attenuatus Holmgren, 1856
Orthocentrus corrugatus Holmgren, 1856
Orthocentrus frontator (Zetterstedt, 1838)
Orthocentrus fulvipes Gravenhorst, 1829
Orthocentrus marginatus Holmgren, 1856
Orthocentrus monilicornis Holmgren, 1856
Orthocentrus petiokiris Thomson, 1897
Orthocentrus protervus Holmgren, 1856
Orthocentrus radialis Thomson, 1897
Orthocentrus repentinus Holmgren, 1856
Orthocentrus sannio Holmgren, 1856
Orthocentrus spurius Gravenhorst, 1829
Orthocentrus stigmaticus Holmgren, 1856
Orthomiscus unicinctus (Holmgren, 1855)
Orthopelma brevicorne Morley, 1907
Orthopelma mediator (Thunberg, 1822)
Otlophorus caninae (Bridgman, 1886)
Otlophorus italicus (Gravenhorst, 1829)
Otlophorus pulverulentus (Holmgren, 1855)
Otlophorus verpetorum (Gravenhorst, 1829)
Oxyrrhexis carbonator (Gravenhorst, 1807)
Oxytorus armatus Thomson, 1883
Oxytorus luridator (Gravenhorst, 1820)

P

Panteles schuetzeana (Roman, 1924)
Pantisarthrus inaequalis Förster, 1871
Pantisarthrus luridus Förster, 1871
Pantorhaestes curvulus (Thomson, 1894)
Pantorhaestes xanthostomus (Gravenhorst, 1829)
Paraethecerus elongatus Perkins, 1953
Parania geniculata (Holmgren, 1857)
Paraperithous gnathaulax (Thomson, 1877)
Parathecerus elongatus Perkins, 1953
Parmortha parvula (Gravenhorst, 1829)
Parmortha pleuralls (Thomson, 1873)
Perelissus pictilis Holmgren, 1855
Perelissus rufoniger (Gravenhorst, 1820)
Perelissus sericeus (Gravenhorst, 1829)
Perelissus spilonotus (Stephens, 1835)
Perilissus buccinator Holmgren, 1855
Perilissus erythrocephalus (Gravenhorst, 1829)
Perilissus flilcornis (Gravenhorst, 1820)
Perilissus lutescens Holmgren, 1855
Perilissus nigricollis Thomson, 1883
Perilissus pallidus (Gravenhorst, 1829)
Perilissus ricievius (Gmelin in Linnaeus, 1790)
Periope auscultator Haliday, 1838
Perispuda bignellii (Bridgman, 1881)
Perispuda facialls (Gravenhorst, 1829)
Perispuda sulphurata (Gravenhorst, 1807)
Perithous albicinctus (Gravenhorst, 1829)
Perithous divinator (Rossius, 1790)
Perithous mediator (Fabricius, 1804)
Perithous scurra (Panzer, 1804)
Perithous septemcinctorius (Thunberg, 1822)
Phaenolobus terebrator (Scopoli, 1763)
Phaeogenes bellicornis Wesmael, 1844
Phaeogenes callopus Wesmael, 1844
Phaeogenes cephalotes Wesmael, 1844
Phaeogenes coriaceus Perkins, 1953
Phaeogenes curator (Thunberg, 1822)
Phaeogenes distinctus (Bridgman, 1888)
Phaeogenes elongatus Thomson, 1891
Phaeogenes eques Wesmael, 1844
Phaeogenes flavidens Wesmael, 1844
Phaeogenes foveolatus Perkins, 1953
Phaeogenes fuscicornis Wesmael, 1844
Phaeogenes heterogonus Holmgren, 1889
Phaeogenes impiger Wesmael, 1844
Phaeogenes infimus Wesmael, 1844
Phaeogenes invisor (Thunberg, 1822)
Phaeogenes ischiomellnus (Gravenhorst, 1829)
Phaeogenes maculicornis (Stephens, 1835)
Phaeogenes melanogonos (Gmelin in Linnaeus, 1790)
Phaeogenes modestus Wesmael, 1844
Phaeogenes mysticus Wesmael, 1855
Phaeogenes ophthalmicus Wesmael, 1844
Phaeogenes osculator (Thunberg, 1822)
Phaeogenes planifrons Wesmael, 1844
Phaeogenes semivulpinus (Gravenhorst, 1829)
Phaeogenes stipator Wesmael, 1855
Phaeogenes suspicax Wesmael, 1844
Phaeogenes trepidus Wesmael, 1844
Phaestus anomalus (Brischke, 1871)
Phobetes atomator (Müller, 1776)
Phobetes chrysostomus (Gravenhorst, 1829)
Phobetes femorator (Thomson, 1894)
Phobetes fuscicornis (Holmgren, 1855)
Phobetes leptocerus (Gravenhorst, 1820)
Phobetes nigriceps (Gravenhorst, 1829)
Phobocampe bicingulata (Gravenhorst, 1829)
Phobocampe crassiuscula (Gravenhorst, 1829)
Phobocampe croceipes (Marshall, 1876)
Phobocampe neglecta (Holmgren, 1860)
Phobocampe obscurella (Holmgren, 1860)
Phobocampe unicincta (Gravenhorst, 1829)
Phradis interstitialis (Thomson, 1889)
Phradis minutus (Bridgman, 1889)
Phradis morionellus (Holmgren, 1860)
Phradis nigritulus (Gravenhorst, 1829)
Phrudus defictus Stelfox, 1966
Phrudus monilicornis (Bridgman, 1886)
Phrudus paradoxus (Schmiedeknecht, 1907)
Phrudus sinuatus (Roman, 1909)
Phthorima compressa (Desvignes, 1856)
Phthorima picta (Habermehl, 1925)
Phthorima xanthaspis (Thomson, 1890)
Phygadeuon acutipenmis Thomson, 1884
Phygadeuon brachyarus Thomson, 1884
Phygadeuon britannicus Habermehl, 1923
Phygadeuon canailculatus Thomson, 1889
Phygadeuon cephalotes Gravenhorst, 1829
Phygadeuon compactus Morley, 1947
Phygadeuon crassicornis (Gravenhorst, 1829)
Phygadeuon cubiceps Thomson, 1884
Phygadeuon cylindraceus Ruthe, 1859
Phygadeuon detestator (Thunberg, 1822)
Phygadeuon devonensis Morley, 1947
Phygadeuon dimidiatus Thomson, 1884
Phygadeuon elliotti Morley, 1947
Phygadeuon exiguus Gravenhorst, 1829
Phygadeuon flavimanus Gravenhorst, 1829
Phygadeuon forticornis (Kriechbaumer, 1892)
Phygadeuon fumator Gravenhorst, 1829
Phygadeuon gallevensis Morley, 1947
Phygadeuon geniculatus (Kriechbaumer, 1892)
Phygadeuon hercynicus Gravenhorst, 1829
Phygadeuon infelix Dalla Torre, 1902
Phygadeuon laeviventris Thomson, 1884
Phygadeuon leucostigmus Gravenhorst, 1829
Phygadeuon lincolniae Morley, 1947
Phygadeuon liosternus Thomson, 1884
Phygadeuon nanus (Gravenhorst, 1829)
Phygadeuon nitidus Gravenhorst, 1829
Phygadeuon oppositus Thomson, 1884
Phygadeuon ovaliformis Dalla Torre, 1902
Phygadeuon ovatus Gravenhorst, 1829
Phygadeuon pallicarpus Thomson, 1884
Phygadeuon paradoxus (Bridgman, 1889)
Phygadeuon pegomyiae Habermehl, 1928
Phygadeuon punctiventris Thomson, 1884
Phygadeuon ragensis Morley, 1947
Phygadeuon rotundipennis Thomson, 1884
Phygadeuon rubricaudus Morley, 1947
Phygadeuon rugulosus Gravenhorst, 1829
Phygadeuon rusticellae Bridgman, 1886
Phygadeuon scaposus Thomson, 1884
Phygadeuon subtilis Gravenhorst, 1829
Phygadeuon sudvoldensis Morley, 1947
Phygadeuon surriensis Morley, 1947
Phygadeuon tenuiscapus Thomson, 1884
Phygadeuon trichops Thomson, 1884
Phygadeuon troglodytes Gravenhorst, 1829
Phygadeuon vagans Gravenhorst, 1829
Phygadeuon variabills Gravenhorst, 1829
Phygadeuon vexator (Thunberg, 1822)
Phytodietus britannicus (Habermehl, 1923)
Phytodietus gelitorius (Thunberg, 1822)
Phytodietus genkularus Thomson, 1877
Phytodietus griseanae Kerrich, 1962
Phytodietus obscurus Desvignes, 1856
Phytodietus ornatus Desvignes, 1856
Phytodietus polyzonias (Forster, 1771)
Phytodietus rufipes Holmgren, 1860
Picrostigeus debilis (Gravenhorst, 1829)
Picrostigeus recticaudus (Thomson, 1897)
Pimpla aethiops Curtis, 1828
Pimpla aquilonia Cresson, 1870
Pimpla arctica Zetterstedt, 1838
Pimpla contemplator (Müller, 1776)
Pimpla flavicoxis Thomson, 1877
Pimpla hypochondriaca (Retzius, 1783)
Pimpla instigator (Fabricius, 1793)
Pimpla melanacrias Perkins, 1941
Pimpla sodalis Ruthe, 1859
Pimpla spuria Gravenhorst, 1829
Pimpla turionellae (Linnaeus, 1758)
Pimpla wilchristi Fitton, Shaw & Gauld, 1988
Piogaster albina Perkins, 1958
Piogaster punctulata Perkins, 1958
Pion fortipes (Gravenhorst, 1829)
Platophion areolaris (Brauns, 1889)
Platophion ocellaris (Ulbricht, 1926)
Platylabops apricus (Gravenhorst, 1820)
Platylabops pulchellatus (Bridgman, 1889)
Platylabus concinnus Thomson, 1888
Platylabus decipiens Wesmael, 1848
Platylabus dolorosus (Gravenhorst, 1829)
Platylabus gigas Kriechbaumer, 1886
Platylabus histrio Wesmael, 1855
Platylabus intermedius Holmgren, 1871
Platylabus iridipennis (Gravenhorst, 1829)
Platylabus nigrocyaneus (Gravenhorst, 1829)
Platylabus obator (Desvignes, 1856)
Platylabus odiosus Perkins, 1953
Platylabus opaculus Thomson, 1888
Platylabus pedatorius (Fabricius, 1793)
Platylabus pumillo Holmgren, 1871
Platylabus punctifrons Thomson, 1888
Platylabus rufiventris Wesmael, 1844
Platylabus rufus Wesmael, 1844
Platylabus stoildus Perkins, 1953
Platylabus tenuicornis (Gravenhorst, 1829)
Platylabus transversus Bridgman, 1889
Platylabus tricingulatus (Gravenhorst, 1820)
Platylabus variegatus Wesmael, 1844
Platylabus vibratorius (Thunberg, 1822)
Platyrhabdus monodon (Thomson, 1884)
Platyrhabdus rufus (Morley, 1907)
Plectiscidea canaliculata (Förster, 1871)
Plectiscidea collaris (Gravenhorst, 1829)
Plectiscidea distincta (Förster, 1871)
Plectiscidea eurystigma (Thomson, 1888)
Plectiscidea fiavicoxis (Förster, 1871)
Plectiscidea humeralis (Förster, 1871)
Plectiscidea hyperborea (Holmgren, 1869)
Plectiscidea melanocera (Förster, 1871)
Plectiscidea sodolis (Förster, 1871)
Plectiscidea subteres (Thomson, 1888)
Plectiscidea subtilis (Förster, 1871)
Plectiscidea tenuicornis (Förster, 1871)
Plectiscidea terebrator (Förster, 1871)
Plectiscus agilis (Holmgren, 1856)
Plectiscus curvicaudatus (Brischke, 1871)
Plectocryptus digitatus (Gmelin in Linnaeus, 1790)
Pleolophus basizonus (Gravenhorst, 1829)
Pleolophus brachypterus (Gravenhorst, 1815)
Pleurogyrus persector (Parfitt, 1882)
Podoschistus scutellaris (Desvignes, 1856)
Poecilostictus cothurnatus (Gravenhorst, 1829)
Poemenia collaris Haupt, 1917
Poemenia hectica (Gravenhorst, 1829)
Poemenia notata Holmgren, 1859
Polyaulon paradoxus (Zetterstedt, 1838)
Polyblastus subalpinus? Holmgren, 1855
Polyblastus alternans Schiedte, 1839
Polyblastus annulicornis Giraud, 1871
Polyblastus bridgmani Parfitt, 1882 nom.dub.
Polyblastus carbonator Kasparyan, 1970
Polyblastus cothurnatus (Gravenhorst, 1829)
Polyblastus macrocentrus Thomson, 1888
Polyblastus melanostigmus Holmgzen, 1855
Polyblastus palaemon Schiedte, 1839
Polyblastus pallicoxa Thomson, 1888
Polyblastus parvulus (Gravenhorst, 1829)
Polyblastus pinguis (Gravenhorst, 1820)
Polyblastus stenocentrus Holmgren, 1855
Polyblastus subalpinus Holmgren, 1855
Polyblastus tener Habermehl, 1909
Polyblastus varitarsus (Gravenhorst, 1829)
Polyblastus wahlbergi Holmgren, 1855
Polyblastus westringi Holmgren, 1855
Polysphincta boops Tschek, 1868
Polysphincta nielseni Roman, 1923
Polysphincta rufipes Gravenhorst, 1829
Polysphincta tuberosa Gravenhorst, 1829
Polysphincta vexator Fitton, Shaw & Gauld, 1988
Polytribax arrogans (Gravenhorst, 1829)
Polytribax errator (Marshall, 1868)
Polytribax flavopunctatus (Bridgman, 1889)
Polytribax perspicillator (Gravenhorst, 1807)
Polytribax rufipes (Gravenhorst, 1829)
Porizontini albidus (Gmelin in Linnaeus, 1790)
Porizontini alienatus (Gravenhorst, 1829)
Porizontini arvensis (Gravenhorst, 1829)
Porizontini bilobus (Thomson, 1887)
Porizontini costalis (Thomson, 1887)
Porizontini crassifemur (Thomson, 1887)
Porizontini deficiens (Gravenhorst, 1829)
Porizontini faunus (Gravenhorst, 1829)
Porizontini geniculatus (Gravenhorst, 1829)
Porizontini molestus (Gravenhorst, 1829)
Porizontini paniscus (Gravenhorst, 1829)
Porizontini planiscapus (Thomson, 1887)
Porizontini ramidulus (Brischke, 1880)
Porizontini renominatus (Morley, 1915)
Porizontini rufifemur (Thomson, 1887)
Porizontini turionus (Ratzeburg, 1844)
Porizontini xanthostomus (Gravenhorst, 1829)
Priopoda stictica (Fabricius, 1798)
Priopoda xanthospana (Gravenhorst, 1829)
Pristiceros infractorius (Linnaeus, 1761)
Pristomerus vulnerator (Panzer, 1799)
Probles erythrostomus (Gravenhorst, 1829)
Probles gilvipes (Gravenhorst, 1829)
Probles marginatus (Bridgman, 1886)
Probles rufipes (Holmgren, 1860)
Probles truncorum (Holmgren, 1860)
Probolus concinnus Wesmael, 1853
Probolus culpatorius (Linnaeus, 1758)
Proclitus clypearis Förster, 1871
Proclitus comes (Haliday, 1838)
Proclitus edwardsi Roman, 1923
Proclitus mesoxanthus Förster, 1871
Proclitus paganus (Haliday, 1838)
Proclitus periculosus Förster, 1871
Proclitus praetor (Haliday, 1838)
Proclitus sincerus Förster, 1871
Promethes bridgmani Fitton, 1976
Promethes dodsi (Morley, 1906)
Promethes sulcator (Gravenhorst, 1829)
Prosticeros infractorius (Linnaeus, 1761)
Prosticeros serrarius Gravenhorst, 1829
Protarchus testatorius (Thunberg, 1822)
Protichneumon coqueberti (Wesmael, 1848)
Protichneumon pisorius (Linnaeus, 1758)
Pseudocymodusa alternans (Gravenhorst, 1829)
Pseudorhyssa alpestris (Holmgren, 1859)
Psilomastax pictus (Kriechbaumer, 1882)
Psilomastax pyramidalis Tischbein, 1868
Pycnocryptus director (Thunberg, 1822)
Pygmaeolus niridus (Bridgman, 1889)
Pyracmon fumipennis (Zetterstedt 1838)

R

Rhaestus lativentris (Holmgren, 1856)
Rhembobius nigriceps (Thomson, 1883)
Rhembobius nigricollis (Thomson, 1883)
Rhembobius perscrutator (Thunberg, 1822)
Rhembobius quadrispinus (Gravenhorst, 1829)
Rhimphoctona megacephala (Gravenhorst, 1829)
Rhimphoctona melanura (Holmgren, 1860)
Rhimphoctona obscuripes (Holmgren, 1860)
Rhimphoctona xoridiformis (Holmgren, 1860)
Rhinotorus atratus (Holmgren, 1855)
Rhinotorus leucostomus (Gravenhorst, 1829)
Rhinotorus longicornis (Schmiedeknecht, 1914)
Rhinotorus similis (Brischke, 1892)
Rhorus lapponicus? (Roman, 1909)
Rhorus caproni (Bridgman, 1882)
Rhorus chrysopus (Gmelin in Linnaeus, 1790)
Rhorus exitirpatorius (Gravenhorst, 1829)
Rhorus glaber (Bridgman, 1886)
Rhorus longicornis (Holmgren, 1856)
Rhorus longigena (Thomson, 1883)
Rhorus mesoxanthus (Gravenhorst, 1829)
Rhorus neustriae (Schrank, 1802)
Rhorus palustris (Holmgren, 1855)
Rhorus subfasciatus (Stephens, 1835)
Rhynchobanchus flavopictus Heinrich
Rhysella approximator (Fabricius, 1793)
Rhyssa persuasoria (Linnaeus, 1758)
Rhyssella approximator (Fabricius, 1793)
Rhyssolabus arcticus Hellén, 1942

S

Scambus annulatus (Kiss, 1924)
Scambus arundinator (Fabricius, 1804)
Scambus brevicornis (Gravenhorst, 1829)
Scambus buolianae (Hartig, 1838)
Scambus calobatus (Gravenhorst, 1829)
Scambus cincticarpus (Krichbaumer, 1895)
Scambus detritus (Holmgren, 1860)
Scambus dilutus (Ratzeburg, 1852)
Scambus elegans (Woldstedt, 1876)
Scambus eucosmidarum (Perkins, 1957)
Scambus foliae (Cushman, 1938)
Scambus nigricans (Thomson, 1877)
Scambus nitidus (Brauns, 1898)
Scambus phragmitidis (Perkins, 1957)
Scambus planatus (Hartig, 1838)
Scambus pomorum (Ratzeburg, 1848)
Scambus sagax Hartig, 1838
Scambus signatus (Pfeffer, 1913)
Scambus vesicarius (Ratzeburg, 1844)
Schenkia graminicola (Gravenhorst, 1829)
Schenkia spinolcie (Gravenhorst, 1829)
Schizopyga circulator (Panzer, 1801)
Schizopyga frigida Cresson, 1870
Schizopyga podagrica Gravenhorst, 1829
Schizopyga varipes Holmgren, 1856
Scizopyga podagrica (Gravenhorst, 1829)
Scolobates auriculatus (Fabricius, 1804)
Scopesis bicolor (Gravenhorst, 1829)
Scopesis depressa (Thomson, 1894)
Scopesis fraterna (Holmgren, 1855)
Scopesis gesticulator (Thunberg, 1822)
Scopesis macropa (Thomson, 1894)
Scopesis obscura (Holmgren, 1855)
Scopesis rufolabris (Zetterstedt, 1838)
Scopesis rufonotata (Holmgren, 1876)
Scopesis tegularis (Thomson, 1894)
Sinarachna anomala (Holmgren, 1860)
Sinarachna nigricornis (Holmgren, 1860)
Sinarachna pallipes (Holmgren, 1860)
Smicroplectrus bohemani (Holmgren, 1855)
Smicroplectrus erosus (Holmgren, 1855)
Smicroplectrus excisus Kerrich, 1952
Smicroplectrus heinrichi Kerrich, 1952
Smicroplectrus jucundus (Holmgren, 1855)
Smicroplectrus perkinsorum Kerrich, 1952
Smicroplectrus quinquecinctus (Gravenhorst, 1820)
Sphecophaga vesparum (Curtis, 1828)
Sphinctus serotinus Gravenhorst, 1829
Spilichneumon celenae Perkins, 1953
Spilichneumon occisorius (Fabricius, 1793)
Spilichneumon stagnicola (Thomson, 1888)
Spilothyrateles fabricii (Schrank, 1802)
Spilothyrateles punctus (Gravenhorst, 1829) preocc.
Spudastica kriechbaumeri (Bridgman, 1882)
Stauropoctonus bombycivorus (Gravenhorst, 1829)
Stenarella gladiator (Scopoli, 1763)
Stenichneumon culpator (Schrank, 1802)
Stenichneumon militarius (Thunberg, 1822)
Stenobarichneumon basiglyptus (Kriechbaumer, 1890)
Stenobarichneumon citator (Thunberg, 1822)
Stenodontus marginellus (Gravenhorst, 1829)
Stenomacrus affinis misident.
Stenomacrus binotatus (Holmgren, 1856)
Stenomacrus carbonariae Roman, 1939
Stenomacrus caudotus (Holmgren, 1856)
Stenomacrus cognatus (Holmgren, 1856)
Stenomacrus concinnus (Holmgren, 1856)
Stenomacrus confinis (Holmgren, 1856)
Stenomacrus cubiceps (Thomson, 1897)
Stenomacrus deletus (Thomson, 1897)
Stenomacrus exserens (Thomson, 1897)
Stenomacrus flaviceps (Gravenhorst, 1829)
Stenomacrus fortipes (Thomson, 1897)
Stenomacrus incisus (Gravenhorst, 1829)
Stenomacrus innotatus (Thomson, 1897)
Stenomacrus intermedius (Holmgren, 1856)
Stenomacrus laricis (Haliday, 1838)
Stenomacrus molestus (Holmgren, 1856)
Stenomacrus ochripes (Holmgren, 1856)
Stenomacrus palustris (Holmgren, 1856)
Stenomacrus reptilis (Marshall, 1877)
Stenomacrus silvaticus (Holmgren, 1856)
Stenomacrus tristis (Holmgren, 1856)
Stenomacrus ventralis (Holmgren, 1856)
Stibeutes curvispinus (Thomson, 1884)
Stibeutes gravenhorstii Förster, 1850
Stibeutes heinemanni Förster, 1850
Stiboscopus angilcanus (Morley, 1907)
Stiboscopus notaulius (Morley, 1947)
Stictopisthus complanatus (Haliday, 1838)
Stictopisthus convexicollis (Thomson, 1886)
Stictopisthus unicinctor (Thunberg, 1822)
Stilbops abdominalls (Gravenhorst, 1829)
Stilbops asper (Schmiedeknecht, 1913)
Stilbops limneriaeformis Schmiedeknecht, 1888
Stilbops Linnaeriformis Schmiedeknecht, 1888
Stilbops ruficornis (Gravenhorst, 1829)
Stilbops vetula (Gravenhorst, 1829)
Stilpnus blandus Gravenhorst, 1829
Stilpnus crassicornis Thomson, 1884
Stilpnus deplanatus Gravenhorst, 1829
Stilpnus dryadum Curtis, 1832
Stilpnus gagates (Gravenhorst, 1807)
Stilpnus pavoniae (Scopoli, 1763)
Stilpnus tenebricosus (Gravenhorst, 1829)
Stilpnus tenuipes Thomson, 1884
Sulcarlus biannulatus (Gravenhorst, 1829)
Sussaba cognata (Holmgren, 1856)
Sussaba coriacea Dasch, 1964
Sussaba dorsalis (Holmgren, 1856)
Sussaba elongata (Provancher, 1874)
Sussaba erigator (Fabricius, 1793)
Sussaba puichella (Holmgren, 1856)
Sussaba punctiventris (Thomson, 1890)
Sympherta ambulator (Thunberg, 1822)
Sympherta antilope (Gravenhorst, 1829)
Sympherta fuscicornis (Gmelin in Linnaeus, 1790)
Symplecis alpicola Förster, 1871
Symplecis breviscula Roman, 1923
Symplecis xanthostoma Förster, 1871
Syndipnus lateralis (Gravenhorst, 1829)
Synetaeris heteropus Thomson, 1887
Synodites facialis? (Thomson, 1894)
Synodites notatus (Gravenhorst, 1829)
Synodites sinister (Brischke, 1871)
Synomelix albipes (Gravenhorst, 1829)
Synomelix scutulata (Hartig, 1838)
Syntactus delusor (Linnaeus, 1758)
Syntactus minor (Holmgren, 1855)
Syntactus minutus (Bridgman, 1886)
Syrphoctonus abdominator (Bridgman, 1886)
Syrphoctonus biguttatus (Gravenhorst, 1829)
Syrphoctonus collinus (Stelfox, 1941)
Syrphoctonus crassicornis (Thomson, 1890)
Syrphoctonus crassicrus (Thomson, 1890)
Syrphoctonus dimidiatus (Schrank, 1802)
Syrphoctonus elegans (Gravenhorst, 1829)
Syrphoctonus fissorius (Gravenhorst, 1829)
Syrphoctonus flavolineatus (Gravenhorst, 1829)
Syrphoctonus gracilentus (Holmgren, 1856)
Syrphoctonus impolitus (Stelfox, 1941)
Syrphoctonus incisus (Thomson, 1890)
Syrphoctonus longiventris (Thomson, 1890)
Syrphoctonus megaspis (Thomson, 1890)
Syrphoctonus neopulcher Horstman, 1968
Syrphoctonus nigritarsus (Gravenhorst, 1829)
Syrphoctonus pallipes (Gravenhorst, 1829)
Syrphoctonus pictus (Gravenhorst, 1829)
Syrphoctonus reflexus (Morley, 1906)
Syrphoctonus signatus (Gravenhorst, 1829)
Syrphoctonus simulans (Stelfox, 1941)
Syrphoctonus strigator (Fabricius, 1793)
Syrphoctonus subopacus (Stelfox, 1941)
Syrphoctonus sundevalli (Holmgren, 1856)
Syrphoctonus tarsatorius (Panzer, 1809)
Syrphoctonus tricolor (Stelfox, 1941)
Syrphophilus bizonarius (Gravenhorst, 1829)
Syrphophilus tricinctorius (Thunberg, 1822)
Syspasis lineator (Fabricius, 1781)
Syspasis rufinus (Gravenhorst, 1820)
Syspasis scutellator (Gravenhorst, 1829)
Syzeuctus bicornis (Gravenhorst, 1829)
Syzeuctus irrisorius (Rossius, 1794)
Syzeuctus maculatorius (Fabricius, 1787) preocc.

T

Temelucha arenosa (Szapligeti, 1900)
Temelucha interruptor (Gravenhorst, 1829)
Temelucha ophthalmica (Holmgren, 1860)
Temelucha signata (Holmgren, 1860)
Tersilochus cognatus (Holmgren, 1860)
Tersilochus heterocerus (Thomson, 1889)
Tersilochus liopleuris (Thomson, 1889)
Tersilochus sallator (Fabricius, 1781) preocc.
Tersilochus triangularis (Gravenhorst, 1807)
Therion brevicorne (Gravenhorst, 1829)
Therion circumfiexum (Linnaeus, 1758)
Theronia atalantae (Poda, 1761)
Theroscopus annulicornis (Thomson, 1884)
Theroscopus hemipterus (Fabricius, 1793)
Theroscopus londinensis (Morley, 1947)
Theroscopus marshalli (Bridgman & Fitch, 1882)
Theroscopus micator (Gravenhorst, 1807)
Theroscopus occisor (Habermehl, 1923)
Theroscopus pedestris (Fabricius, 1775)
Thrybius leucopygus (Gravenhorst, 1829)
Thymaris contaminatus (Gravenhorst, 1829)
Thymaris fenestralis Morley, 1908
Thymaris srikem Fitton & Ficken, 1989
Thymaris tener (Gravenhorst, 1829)
Townesia tenuiventris (Holmgren, 1860)
Trachyarus corvinus Thomson, 1891
Tranosema arenicola Thomson, 1887
Trematopygus dictator (Thunberg, 1822)
Trematopygus vellicans (Gravenhorst, 1829)
Tricholabus strigatorius (Gravenhorst, 1829)
Trichomma enecator (Rossius, 1790)
Trichomma fulvidens (Wesmael, 1849)
Trichomma intermedium Krieger, 1904
Trichomma occisor Habermehl, 1909
Triclistus aethiops (Gravenhorst, 1829)
Triclistus albicinctus Thomson, 1887
Triclistus areolatus Thomson, 1887
Triclistus congener (Holmgren, 1856)
Triclistus facialis Thomson, 1887
Triclistus globulipes (Desvignes, 1856)
Triclistus lativentris Thomson, 1887
Triclistus longicalcar Thomson, 1887
Triclistus niger (Bridgman, 1883)
Triclistus pallipes Holmgren, 1873
Triclistus podogricus (Gravenhorst, 1829)
Triclistus pubiventris Thomson, 1887
Triclistus pygmaeus (Cresson, 1864)
Triclistus spiracularis Thomson, 1887
Triclistus squalidus (Holmgren, 1856)
Triclistus yponomeutae Aeschlimann, 1973
Trieces tricarinatus (Holmgren, 1856)
Trigonalis hahnii (Spinola, 1840)
Triptognathus amatorius (Müller, 1776)
Triptognathus johansoni (Holmgren, 1871)
Triptognathus propinauus (Perkins, 1953)
Triptognathus pulchellus (Christ, 1791)
Trogus lapidator (Fabricius, 1787)
Tromatobia forsiusi (Hellen, 1915)
Tromatobia oculatoria (Fabricius, 1798)
Tromatobia ornata (Gravenhorst, 1829)
Tromatobia ovivora (Boheman, 1821)
Tromatobia rufipleura (Bignell, 1889)
Tromatobia variabilis (Holmgren, 1856)
Tropistes nitidipennis Gravenhorst, 1829
Trychosis legator (Thunberg, 1822)
Trychosis mesocastana (Tschek, 1870)
Tryphon abditus Kasparyan, 1969
Tryphon anceps Stephens, 1853 nom dub
Tryphon atriceps Stephens, 1835
Tryphon auricularis Thomson, 1883
Tryphon bidentatus Stephens, 1835
Tryphon bidentulus Thomson, 1883
Tryphon brunniventris Gravenhorst, 1829
Tryphon duplicatus (Heinrich, 1953)
Tryphon exclamationis Gravenhorst, 1829
Tryphon heliophilus Gravenhorst, 1829
Tryphon incestus Holmgren, 1855
Tryphon nigripes Holmgren, 1855
Tryphon obtusator (Thunberg, 1822)
Tryphon relator (Thunberg, 1822)
Tryphon rngnpes Holmgren, 1855
Tryphon rutilator (Linnaeus, 1161)
Tryphon signator Gravenhorst, 1829
Tryphon subsulcatus Holmgren, 1855
Tryphon thomsoni Roman, 1939
Tryphon thoracicus Stephens, 1853 nom dub
Tryphon trochanteratus Holmgren, 1855
Tryphon zonatus Stephens, 1853 nom dub
Tymmophorus graculus (Gravenhorst, 1829)
Tymmophorus obscuripes (Holmgren, 1856)
Tymmorphorus rufiventris (Gravenhorst, 1829)

V

Venturia canescens (Gravenhorst, 1829)
Venturia moderator (Linnaeus, 1758)
Venturia transfuga (Gravenhorst, 1829)
Vulgichneumon saturatorius (Linnaeus, 1758)

W

Woldstedtius abdominator (Bridgman, 1829)
Woldstedtius biguttatus (Gravenhorst, 1829)
Woldstedtius flavolineatus (Gravenhorst, 1829)

X

Xenolytus bitinctus (Gmelin in Linnaeus, 1790)
Xenoschesis fulvipes (Gravenhorst, 1829)
Xenoschesis resplendens (Holmgren, 1855)
Xenoschesis ustulata (Desvignes, 1856)
Xestopelta gracillima (Schmiedeknecht, 1926)
Xiphulcus floricolator (Gravenhorst, 1807)
Xorides brachylabis (Kriechbaumer, 1889)
Xorides cskii Clément, 1938
Xorides fuilgator (Thunberg, 1822)
Xorides gravenhorstii (Curtis, 1831)
Xorides irrigator (Fabricius, 1793)
Xorides niger (Pfeffer, 1913)
Xorides praecatorius (Fabricius, 1793)
Xorides rufipes (Gravenhorst, 1829)
Xorides rusticus (Desvignes, 1856)
Xorides securicornis (Holmgren, 1860)
Xylophrurus dispar (Thunberg, 1822)

Z

Zaglyptus multicolor (Gravenhorst, 1829)
Zaglyptus varipes (Gravenhorst, 1829)
Zatypota albicoxa (Walker, 1874)
Zatypota bohemani (Holmgren, 1860)
Zatypota discolor (Holmgren, 1860)
Zatypota percontatoria (Mailer, 1776)

References

 Aubert, J. F. (1969): Les Ichneumonides ouest-palearctiques et leurs hotes 1. Pimplinae, Xoridinae, Acaenitinae ["The Western Palearctic ichneumon wasps and their hosts. 1. Pimplinae, Xoridinae, Acaenitinae"]. Laboratoire d'évolution des êtres organisés, Paris. [in French]
 Aubert, J. F. (1978): Les Ichneumonides ouest-palearctiques et leurs hotes 2. Banchinae et Suppl. aux Pimplinae ["The Western Palearctic ichneumon wasps and their hosts. 2. Banchinae and supplement to the Pimplinae"]. Laboratoire d'évolution des êtres organisés, Paris & EDIFAT-OPIDA, Echauffour. [in French]
 Aubert, J. F. (2000): Les ichneumonides oeust-palearctiques et leurs hotes. 3. Scolobatinae (=Ctenopelmatinae) et suppl. aux volumes precedents [The West Palaearctic ichneumonids and their hosts. 3. Scolobatinae (= Ctenopelmatinae) and supplements to preceding volumes]. Litterae Zoologicae 5: 1-310.
 Fitton, M.G. & I. D. Gauld (1976): The family-group names of the Ichneumonidae (excluding Ichneumoninae) (Hymenoptera). Systematic Entomology 1: 247-258.
 Fitton, M. G. & I. D. Gauld (1978): Further notes on family-group names of Ichneumonidae (Hymenoptera). Systematic Entomology 3: 245-247.
 Gauld, I. D. (1976): The classification of the Anomaloninae (Hymenoptera: Ichneumonidae). Bulletin of the British Museum of Natural History (Entomology) 33: 1-135.
 Oehlke J. (1966): Die westpaläarktische Arte der Tribus Poemeniini (Hymenoptera, Ichneumonidae) ["The Western Palearctic species of the tribe Poemeniini"]. Beiträge zur Entomologie 15: 881-892.
 Oehlke J. (1967): Westpaläarktische Ichneumonidae 1, Ephialtinae. Hymenopterorum Catalogus (new edition) 2: 1–49.
 Perkins, J. F. (1959): Ichneumonidae, key to subfamilies and Ichneumoninae – 1. Handbook for the Identification of British Insects 7(part 2ai): 1–116.
 Perkins, J. F. (1960): Hymenoptera: Ichneumonoidea: Ichneumonidae, subfamilies Ichneumoninae 2, Alomyinae, Agriotypinae and Lycorininae. Handbk Ident. Br. Insects 7(part 2aii): 1–96.	
 Sime, K., & A. Brower (1998): Explaining the latitudinal gradient anomaly in ichneumonid species richness: evidence from butterflies. Journal of Animal Ecology 67: 387-399
 Townes, H. K. (1969): Genera of Ichneumonidae, Part 1 (Ephialtinae, Tryphoninae, Labiinae, Adelognathinae, Xoridinae, Agriotypinae). Memoirs of the American Entomological Institute 11: 1-300.
 Townes, H. K. (1969): Genera of Ichneumonidae, Part 2 (Gelinae). Memoirs of the American Entomological Institute 12: 1-537.
 Townes, H. K. (1969): Genera of Ichneumonidae, Part 3 (Lycorininae, Banchinae, Scolobatinae, Porizontinae). Memoirs of the American Entomological Institute 13: 1-307.
 Townes, H. K. (1971): Genera of Ichneumonidae, Part 4 (Cremastinae, Phrudinae, Tersilochinae, Ophioninae, Mesochorinae, Metopiinae, Anomalinae, Acaenitinae, Microleptinae, Orthopelmatinae, Collyriinae, Orthocentrinae, Diplazontinae). Memoirs of the American Entomological Institute 17: 1-372.
 Townes, H. K., S. A. Momoi & M. Townes (1965): Catalogue and Reclassification of Eastern Palearctic Ichneumonidae  Memoirs of the American Entomological Institute 5: 1-661 pages.
 Wahl, David (1999): Classification and Systematics of the Ichneumonidae (Hymenoptera). Version of July 19, 1999. Retrieved June 18, 2008.

External links

Key to Subfamilies found in Britain and Ireland  Extensive use of images.

Ichneumonidae
Biological pest control wasps
Checklists